

315001–315100 

|-bgcolor=#d6d6d6
| 315001 ||  || — || January 15, 2007 || Catalina || CSS || — || align=right | 2.6 km || 
|-id=002 bgcolor=#E9E9E9
| 315002 ||  || — || January 9, 2007 || Mount Lemmon || Mount Lemmon Survey || — || align=right | 2.4 km || 
|-id=003 bgcolor=#E9E9E9
| 315003 ||  || — || January 10, 2007 || Kitt Peak || Spacewatch || — || align=right | 3.7 km || 
|-id=004 bgcolor=#d6d6d6
| 315004 ||  || — || January 8, 2007 || Mount Lemmon || Mount Lemmon Survey || EOS || align=right | 2.3 km || 
|-id=005 bgcolor=#fefefe
| 315005 || 2007 BE || — || January 16, 2007 || Anderson Mesa || LONEOS || H || align=right data-sort-value="0.86" | 860 m || 
|-id=006 bgcolor=#d6d6d6
| 315006 ||  || — || January 16, 2007 || Mount Lemmon || Mount Lemmon Survey || — || align=right | 3.2 km || 
|-id=007 bgcolor=#d6d6d6
| 315007 ||  || — || January 24, 2007 || Mount Lemmon || Mount Lemmon Survey || — || align=right | 2.7 km || 
|-id=008 bgcolor=#d6d6d6
| 315008 ||  || — || January 17, 2007 || Palomar || NEAT || — || align=right | 2.9 km || 
|-id=009 bgcolor=#E9E9E9
| 315009 ||  || — || January 17, 2007 || Palomar || NEAT || — || align=right | 2.0 km || 
|-id=010 bgcolor=#d6d6d6
| 315010 ||  || — || January 24, 2007 || Mount Lemmon || Mount Lemmon Survey || EOS || align=right | 1.8 km || 
|-id=011 bgcolor=#d6d6d6
| 315011 ||  || — || January 24, 2007 || Catalina || CSS || TIR || align=right | 4.0 km || 
|-id=012 bgcolor=#d6d6d6
| 315012 Hutchings ||  ||  || January 20, 2007 || Mauna Kea || D. D. Balam || — || align=right | 3.0 km || 
|-id=013 bgcolor=#d6d6d6
| 315013 ||  || — || January 24, 2007 || Mount Lemmon || Mount Lemmon Survey || — || align=right | 3.1 km || 
|-id=014 bgcolor=#d6d6d6
| 315014 ||  || — || January 24, 2007 || Mount Lemmon || Mount Lemmon Survey || 628 || align=right | 2.2 km || 
|-id=015 bgcolor=#d6d6d6
| 315015 ||  || — || January 24, 2007 || Mount Lemmon || Mount Lemmon Survey || KOR || align=right | 1.5 km || 
|-id=016 bgcolor=#d6d6d6
| 315016 ||  || — || January 24, 2007 || Catalina || CSS || BRA || align=right | 1.8 km || 
|-id=017 bgcolor=#fefefe
| 315017 ||  || — || January 24, 2007 || Catalina || CSS || H || align=right data-sort-value="0.74" | 740 m || 
|-id=018 bgcolor=#d6d6d6
| 315018 ||  || — || January 26, 2007 || Kitt Peak || Spacewatch || — || align=right | 3.3 km || 
|-id=019 bgcolor=#d6d6d6
| 315019 ||  || — || January 26, 2007 || Kitt Peak || Spacewatch || — || align=right | 3.5 km || 
|-id=020 bgcolor=#FFC2E0
| 315020 ||  || — || January 28, 2007 || Kitt Peak || Spacewatch || AMO || align=right data-sort-value="0.63" | 630 m || 
|-id=021 bgcolor=#d6d6d6
| 315021 ||  || — || January 24, 2007 || Socorro || LINEAR || — || align=right | 3.0 km || 
|-id=022 bgcolor=#d6d6d6
| 315022 ||  || — || January 24, 2007 || Catalina || CSS || — || align=right | 4.1 km || 
|-id=023 bgcolor=#d6d6d6
| 315023 ||  || — || January 27, 2007 || Mount Lemmon || Mount Lemmon Survey || — || align=right | 2.2 km || 
|-id=024 bgcolor=#d6d6d6
| 315024 ||  || — || January 27, 2007 || Mount Lemmon || Mount Lemmon Survey || — || align=right | 3.2 km || 
|-id=025 bgcolor=#d6d6d6
| 315025 ||  || — || January 27, 2007 || Mount Lemmon || Mount Lemmon Survey || — || align=right | 3.8 km || 
|-id=026 bgcolor=#d6d6d6
| 315026 ||  || — || January 27, 2007 || Mount Lemmon || Mount Lemmon Survey || — || align=right | 4.1 km || 
|-id=027 bgcolor=#d6d6d6
| 315027 ||  || — || January 27, 2007 || Mount Lemmon || Mount Lemmon Survey || — || align=right | 2.0 km || 
|-id=028 bgcolor=#d6d6d6
| 315028 ||  || — || January 17, 2007 || Kitt Peak || Spacewatch || — || align=right | 3.0 km || 
|-id=029 bgcolor=#d6d6d6
| 315029 ||  || — || January 26, 2007 || Kitt Peak || Spacewatch || — || align=right | 2.7 km || 
|-id=030 bgcolor=#d6d6d6
| 315030 ||  || — || January 25, 2007 || Kitt Peak || Spacewatch || SYL7:4 || align=right | 4.1 km || 
|-id=031 bgcolor=#d6d6d6
| 315031 ||  || — || January 27, 2007 || Mount Lemmon || Mount Lemmon Survey || — || align=right | 3.2 km || 
|-id=032 bgcolor=#d6d6d6
| 315032 ||  || — || February 6, 2007 || Kitt Peak || Spacewatch || — || align=right | 3.9 km || 
|-id=033 bgcolor=#d6d6d6
| 315033 ||  || — || February 6, 2007 || Kitt Peak || Spacewatch || CHA || align=right | 2.5 km || 
|-id=034 bgcolor=#E9E9E9
| 315034 ||  || — || January 27, 2007 || Kitt Peak || Spacewatch || — || align=right | 1.8 km || 
|-id=035 bgcolor=#d6d6d6
| 315035 ||  || — || February 5, 2007 || Palomar || NEAT || — || align=right | 4.5 km || 
|-id=036 bgcolor=#d6d6d6
| 315036 ||  || — || February 6, 2007 || Palomar || NEAT || EOS || align=right | 2.1 km || 
|-id=037 bgcolor=#d6d6d6
| 315037 ||  || — || February 6, 2007 || Mount Lemmon || Mount Lemmon Survey || — || align=right | 3.3 km || 
|-id=038 bgcolor=#d6d6d6
| 315038 ||  || — || February 7, 2007 || Mount Lemmon || Mount Lemmon Survey || KAR || align=right | 1.1 km || 
|-id=039 bgcolor=#d6d6d6
| 315039 ||  || — || February 8, 2007 || Mount Lemmon || Mount Lemmon Survey || EOS || align=right | 2.0 km || 
|-id=040 bgcolor=#d6d6d6
| 315040 ||  || — || February 10, 2007 || Marly || P. Kocher || — || align=right | 3.5 km || 
|-id=041 bgcolor=#d6d6d6
| 315041 ||  || — || February 6, 2007 || Mount Lemmon || Mount Lemmon Survey || — || align=right | 2.7 km || 
|-id=042 bgcolor=#d6d6d6
| 315042 ||  || — || February 6, 2007 || Kitt Peak || Spacewatch || EOS || align=right | 2.8 km || 
|-id=043 bgcolor=#d6d6d6
| 315043 ||  || — || February 6, 2007 || Mount Lemmon || Mount Lemmon Survey || — || align=right | 3.1 km || 
|-id=044 bgcolor=#d6d6d6
| 315044 ||  || — || February 8, 2007 || Palomar || NEAT || EOS || align=right | 2.3 km || 
|-id=045 bgcolor=#d6d6d6
| 315045 ||  || — || February 10, 2007 || Mount Lemmon || Mount Lemmon Survey || — || align=right | 2.6 km || 
|-id=046 bgcolor=#E9E9E9
| 315046 Gianniferrari ||  ||  || February 13, 2007 || San Marcello || L. Tesi, G. Fagioli || — || align=right | 3.4 km || 
|-id=047 bgcolor=#d6d6d6
| 315047 ||  || — || January 17, 2007 || Catalina || CSS || — || align=right | 3.8 km || 
|-id=048 bgcolor=#d6d6d6
| 315048 ||  || — || February 13, 2007 || Socorro || LINEAR || — || align=right | 3.6 km || 
|-id=049 bgcolor=#E9E9E9
| 315049 ||  || — || February 13, 2007 || Socorro || LINEAR || — || align=right | 3.8 km || 
|-id=050 bgcolor=#d6d6d6
| 315050 ||  || — || January 26, 2007 || Anderson Mesa || LONEOS || — || align=right | 3.7 km || 
|-id=051 bgcolor=#d6d6d6
| 315051 ||  || — || February 10, 2007 || Catalina || CSS || — || align=right | 4.7 km || 
|-id=052 bgcolor=#d6d6d6
| 315052 ||  || — || February 10, 2007 || Catalina || CSS || LIX || align=right | 4.8 km || 
|-id=053 bgcolor=#d6d6d6
| 315053 || 2007 DZ || — || February 16, 2007 || Calvin-Rehoboth || Calvin–Rehoboth Obs. || TIR || align=right | 4.0 km || 
|-id=054 bgcolor=#d6d6d6
| 315054 ||  || — || February 16, 2007 || Mount Lemmon || Mount Lemmon Survey || URS || align=right | 3.9 km || 
|-id=055 bgcolor=#d6d6d6
| 315055 ||  || — || February 16, 2007 || Palomar || NEAT || EMA || align=right | 5.6 km || 
|-id=056 bgcolor=#d6d6d6
| 315056 ||  || — || February 17, 2007 || Kitt Peak || Spacewatch || EOS || align=right | 1.8 km || 
|-id=057 bgcolor=#d6d6d6
| 315057 ||  || — || February 17, 2007 || Kitt Peak || Spacewatch || — || align=right | 3.5 km || 
|-id=058 bgcolor=#d6d6d6
| 315058 ||  || — || February 17, 2007 || Kitt Peak || Spacewatch || HYG || align=right | 2.5 km || 
|-id=059 bgcolor=#d6d6d6
| 315059 ||  || — || February 17, 2007 || Kitt Peak || Spacewatch || — || align=right | 2.5 km || 
|-id=060 bgcolor=#d6d6d6
| 315060 ||  || — || February 17, 2007 || Kitt Peak || Spacewatch || HYG || align=right | 3.3 km || 
|-id=061 bgcolor=#d6d6d6
| 315061 ||  || — || February 17, 2007 || Kitt Peak || Spacewatch || — || align=right | 4.2 km || 
|-id=062 bgcolor=#d6d6d6
| 315062 ||  || — || February 17, 2007 || Kitt Peak || Spacewatch || — || align=right | 2.3 km || 
|-id=063 bgcolor=#d6d6d6
| 315063 ||  || — || February 17, 2007 || Kitt Peak || Spacewatch || — || align=right | 3.3 km || 
|-id=064 bgcolor=#d6d6d6
| 315064 ||  || — || February 17, 2007 || Kitt Peak || Spacewatch || — || align=right | 3.5 km || 
|-id=065 bgcolor=#d6d6d6
| 315065 ||  || — || February 17, 2007 || Kitt Peak || Spacewatch || — || align=right | 3.3 km || 
|-id=066 bgcolor=#d6d6d6
| 315066 ||  || — || February 17, 2007 || Kitt Peak || Spacewatch || — || align=right | 2.3 km || 
|-id=067 bgcolor=#d6d6d6
| 315067 ||  || — || February 17, 2007 || Kitt Peak || Spacewatch || — || align=right | 3.2 km || 
|-id=068 bgcolor=#d6d6d6
| 315068 ||  || — || February 17, 2007 || Kitt Peak || Spacewatch || — || align=right | 4.5 km || 
|-id=069 bgcolor=#d6d6d6
| 315069 ||  || — || February 17, 2007 || Kitt Peak || Spacewatch || — || align=right | 2.6 km || 
|-id=070 bgcolor=#d6d6d6
| 315070 ||  || — || February 19, 2007 || Mount Lemmon || Mount Lemmon Survey || — || align=right | 4.6 km || 
|-id=071 bgcolor=#d6d6d6
| 315071 ||  || — || February 17, 2007 || Catalina || CSS || — || align=right | 3.3 km || 
|-id=072 bgcolor=#d6d6d6
| 315072 ||  || — || November 20, 2006 || Mount Lemmon || Mount Lemmon Survey || — || align=right | 3.8 km || 
|-id=073 bgcolor=#d6d6d6
| 315073 ||  || — || February 21, 2007 || Mount Lemmon || Mount Lemmon Survey || VER || align=right | 4.5 km || 
|-id=074 bgcolor=#d6d6d6
| 315074 ||  || — || February 17, 2007 || Mount Lemmon || Mount Lemmon Survey || SYL7:4 || align=right | 5.1 km || 
|-id=075 bgcolor=#d6d6d6
| 315075 ||  || — || February 19, 2007 || Mount Lemmon || Mount Lemmon Survey || EOS || align=right | 2.6 km || 
|-id=076 bgcolor=#d6d6d6
| 315076 ||  || — || February 21, 2007 || Mount Lemmon || Mount Lemmon Survey || — || align=right | 3.3 km || 
|-id=077 bgcolor=#d6d6d6
| 315077 ||  || — || February 21, 2007 || Mount Lemmon || Mount Lemmon Survey || — || align=right | 3.5 km || 
|-id=078 bgcolor=#d6d6d6
| 315078 ||  || — || February 22, 2007 || Anderson Mesa || LONEOS || — || align=right | 4.7 km || 
|-id=079 bgcolor=#d6d6d6
| 315079 ||  || — || February 22, 2007 || Socorro || LINEAR || — || align=right | 5.3 km || 
|-id=080 bgcolor=#d6d6d6
| 315080 ||  || — || February 21, 2007 || Kitt Peak || Spacewatch || ANF || align=right | 1.4 km || 
|-id=081 bgcolor=#d6d6d6
| 315081 ||  || — || February 21, 2007 || Kitt Peak || Spacewatch || — || align=right | 2.1 km || 
|-id=082 bgcolor=#d6d6d6
| 315082 ||  || — || February 21, 2007 || Kitt Peak || Spacewatch || — || align=right | 2.3 km || 
|-id=083 bgcolor=#d6d6d6
| 315083 ||  || — || February 21, 2007 || Kitt Peak || Spacewatch || — || align=right | 3.7 km || 
|-id=084 bgcolor=#d6d6d6
| 315084 ||  || — || February 21, 2007 || Kitt Peak || Spacewatch || — || align=right | 2.5 km || 
|-id=085 bgcolor=#d6d6d6
| 315085 ||  || — || February 21, 2007 || Kitt Peak || Spacewatch || — || align=right | 2.9 km || 
|-id=086 bgcolor=#d6d6d6
| 315086 ||  || — || February 23, 2007 || Mount Lemmon || Mount Lemmon Survey || — || align=right | 2.9 km || 
|-id=087 bgcolor=#d6d6d6
| 315087 ||  || — || February 25, 2007 || Mount Lemmon || Mount Lemmon Survey || — || align=right | 3.9 km || 
|-id=088 bgcolor=#d6d6d6
| 315088 Daniels ||  ||  || February 21, 2007 || Astronomical Research Obs. || R. Holmes || — || align=right | 3.2 km || 
|-id=089 bgcolor=#d6d6d6
| 315089 ||  || — || January 27, 2007 || Mount Lemmon || Mount Lemmon Survey || EOS || align=right | 2.6 km || 
|-id=090 bgcolor=#d6d6d6
| 315090 ||  || — || February 23, 2007 || Kitt Peak || Spacewatch || — || align=right | 3.4 km || 
|-id=091 bgcolor=#d6d6d6
| 315091 ||  || — || February 23, 2007 || Kitt Peak || Spacewatch || EOS || align=right | 2.7 km || 
|-id=092 bgcolor=#d6d6d6
| 315092 ||  || — || February 23, 2007 || Mount Lemmon || Mount Lemmon Survey || — || align=right | 3.6 km || 
|-id=093 bgcolor=#d6d6d6
| 315093 ||  || — || February 23, 2007 || Mount Lemmon || Mount Lemmon Survey || EOS || align=right | 1.9 km || 
|-id=094 bgcolor=#d6d6d6
| 315094 ||  || — || February 23, 2007 || Mount Lemmon || Mount Lemmon Survey || — || align=right | 4.0 km || 
|-id=095 bgcolor=#d6d6d6
| 315095 ||  || — || February 25, 2007 || Mount Lemmon || Mount Lemmon Survey || — || align=right | 3.6 km || 
|-id=096 bgcolor=#d6d6d6
| 315096 ||  || — || February 27, 2007 || Kitt Peak || Spacewatch || — || align=right | 3.2 km || 
|-id=097 bgcolor=#d6d6d6
| 315097 ||  || — || February 23, 2007 || Catalina || CSS || — || align=right | 4.3 km || 
|-id=098 bgcolor=#FFC2E0
| 315098 || 2007 EX || — || March 10, 2007 || Siding Spring || SSS || ATE +1km || align=right data-sort-value="0.99" | 990 m || 
|-id=099 bgcolor=#d6d6d6
| 315099 ||  || — || March 9, 2007 || Catalina || CSS || — || align=right | 4.5 km || 
|-id=100 bgcolor=#d6d6d6
| 315100 ||  || — || March 9, 2007 || Kitt Peak || Spacewatch || — || align=right | 4.7 km || 
|}

315101–315200 

|-bgcolor=#d6d6d6
| 315101 ||  || — || March 9, 2007 || Mount Lemmon || Mount Lemmon Survey || — || align=right | 2.8 km || 
|-id=102 bgcolor=#d6d6d6
| 315102 ||  || — || March 9, 2007 || Mount Lemmon || Mount Lemmon Survey || — || align=right | 3.9 km || 
|-id=103 bgcolor=#d6d6d6
| 315103 ||  || — || March 9, 2007 || Mount Lemmon || Mount Lemmon Survey || — || align=right | 4.1 km || 
|-id=104 bgcolor=#d6d6d6
| 315104 ||  || — || November 17, 2006 || Kitt Peak || Spacewatch || EOS || align=right | 2.8 km || 
|-id=105 bgcolor=#d6d6d6
| 315105 ||  || — || March 10, 2007 || Mount Lemmon || Mount Lemmon Survey || EOS || align=right | 2.2 km || 
|-id=106 bgcolor=#d6d6d6
| 315106 ||  || — || March 10, 2007 || Palomar || NEAT || — || align=right | 2.5 km || 
|-id=107 bgcolor=#d6d6d6
| 315107 ||  || — || March 11, 2007 || Marly || P. Kocher || — || align=right | 2.8 km || 
|-id=108 bgcolor=#d6d6d6
| 315108 ||  || — || March 10, 2007 || Palomar || NEAT || — || align=right | 3.7 km || 
|-id=109 bgcolor=#d6d6d6
| 315109 ||  || — || March 11, 2007 || Anderson Mesa || LONEOS || — || align=right | 3.9 km || 
|-id=110 bgcolor=#d6d6d6
| 315110 ||  || — || March 11, 2007 || Mount Lemmon || Mount Lemmon Survey || — || align=right | 3.4 km || 
|-id=111 bgcolor=#d6d6d6
| 315111 ||  || — || March 11, 2007 || Mount Lemmon || Mount Lemmon Survey || — || align=right | 4.0 km || 
|-id=112 bgcolor=#d6d6d6
| 315112 ||  || — || March 9, 2007 || Kitt Peak || Spacewatch || — || align=right | 2.5 km || 
|-id=113 bgcolor=#FA8072
| 315113 ||  || — || March 9, 2007 || Kitt Peak || Spacewatch || H || align=right | 1.0 km || 
|-id=114 bgcolor=#d6d6d6
| 315114 ||  || — || March 10, 2007 || Mount Lemmon || Mount Lemmon Survey || HYG || align=right | 3.0 km || 
|-id=115 bgcolor=#d6d6d6
| 315115 ||  || — || March 10, 2007 || Palomar || NEAT || — || align=right | 5.4 km || 
|-id=116 bgcolor=#fefefe
| 315116 ||  || — || March 11, 2007 || Catalina || CSS || H || align=right data-sort-value="0.63" | 630 m || 
|-id=117 bgcolor=#d6d6d6
| 315117 ||  || — || March 11, 2007 || Mount Lemmon || Mount Lemmon Survey || — || align=right | 4.0 km || 
|-id=118 bgcolor=#d6d6d6
| 315118 ||  || — || March 10, 2007 || Kitt Peak || Spacewatch || — || align=right | 3.8 km || 
|-id=119 bgcolor=#d6d6d6
| 315119 ||  || — || March 10, 2007 || Kitt Peak || Spacewatch || — || align=right | 3.3 km || 
|-id=120 bgcolor=#d6d6d6
| 315120 ||  || — || March 10, 2007 || Kitt Peak || Spacewatch || EMA || align=right | 3.0 km || 
|-id=121 bgcolor=#d6d6d6
| 315121 ||  || — || March 10, 2007 || Kitt Peak || Spacewatch || — || align=right | 4.4 km || 
|-id=122 bgcolor=#d6d6d6
| 315122 ||  || — || March 11, 2007 || Mount Lemmon || Mount Lemmon Survey || EUP || align=right | 7.4 km || 
|-id=123 bgcolor=#d6d6d6
| 315123 ||  || — || March 11, 2007 || Anderson Mesa || LONEOS || — || align=right | 4.8 km || 
|-id=124 bgcolor=#d6d6d6
| 315124 ||  || — || March 11, 2007 || Anderson Mesa || LONEOS || TIR || align=right | 4.0 km || 
|-id=125 bgcolor=#d6d6d6
| 315125 ||  || — || March 12, 2007 || Catalina || CSS || EOS || align=right | 3.2 km || 
|-id=126 bgcolor=#d6d6d6
| 315126 ||  || — || March 12, 2007 || Catalina || CSS || URS || align=right | 4.9 km || 
|-id=127 bgcolor=#fefefe
| 315127 ||  || — || March 12, 2007 || Catalina || CSS || H || align=right data-sort-value="0.68" | 680 m || 
|-id=128 bgcolor=#d6d6d6
| 315128 ||  || — || March 9, 2007 || Kitt Peak || Spacewatch || EUP || align=right | 4.1 km || 
|-id=129 bgcolor=#d6d6d6
| 315129 ||  || — || March 10, 2007 || Mount Lemmon || Mount Lemmon Survey || — || align=right | 3.1 km || 
|-id=130 bgcolor=#d6d6d6
| 315130 ||  || — || February 26, 2007 || Mount Lemmon || Mount Lemmon Survey || 637 || align=right | 2.7 km || 
|-id=131 bgcolor=#d6d6d6
| 315131 ||  || — || March 11, 2007 || Kitt Peak || Spacewatch || — || align=right | 3.0 km || 
|-id=132 bgcolor=#d6d6d6
| 315132 ||  || — || March 11, 2007 || Catalina || CSS || — || align=right | 4.2 km || 
|-id=133 bgcolor=#d6d6d6
| 315133 ||  || — || February 23, 2007 || Mount Lemmon || Mount Lemmon Survey || — || align=right | 2.5 km || 
|-id=134 bgcolor=#d6d6d6
| 315134 ||  || — || March 11, 2007 || Kitt Peak || Spacewatch || — || align=right | 3.1 km || 
|-id=135 bgcolor=#d6d6d6
| 315135 ||  || — || March 11, 2007 || Kitt Peak || Spacewatch || — || align=right | 4.7 km || 
|-id=136 bgcolor=#d6d6d6
| 315136 ||  || — || March 12, 2007 || Kitt Peak || Spacewatch || — || align=right | 2.5 km || 
|-id=137 bgcolor=#d6d6d6
| 315137 ||  || — || March 12, 2007 || Kitt Peak || Spacewatch || — || align=right | 2.8 km || 
|-id=138 bgcolor=#d6d6d6
| 315138 ||  || — || November 24, 2006 || Mount Lemmon || Mount Lemmon Survey || — || align=right | 3.9 km || 
|-id=139 bgcolor=#d6d6d6
| 315139 ||  || — || March 9, 2007 || Kitt Peak || Spacewatch || — || align=right | 3.0 km || 
|-id=140 bgcolor=#d6d6d6
| 315140 ||  || — || February 23, 2007 || Mount Lemmon || Mount Lemmon Survey || THM || align=right | 2.3 km || 
|-id=141 bgcolor=#d6d6d6
| 315141 ||  || — || March 12, 2007 || Mount Lemmon || Mount Lemmon Survey || — || align=right | 3.8 km || 
|-id=142 bgcolor=#d6d6d6
| 315142 ||  || — || March 12, 2007 || Kitt Peak || Spacewatch || HYG || align=right | 3.0 km || 
|-id=143 bgcolor=#d6d6d6
| 315143 ||  || — || March 14, 2007 || Catalina || CSS || — || align=right | 4.7 km || 
|-id=144 bgcolor=#d6d6d6
| 315144 ||  || — || March 14, 2007 || Catalina || CSS || EUP || align=right | 5.0 km || 
|-id=145 bgcolor=#d6d6d6
| 315145 ||  || — || March 13, 2007 || Kitt Peak || Spacewatch || 7:4 || align=right | 4.0 km || 
|-id=146 bgcolor=#d6d6d6
| 315146 ||  || — || March 15, 2007 || Catalina || CSS || — || align=right | 3.7 km || 
|-id=147 bgcolor=#d6d6d6
| 315147 ||  || — || March 14, 2007 || Kitt Peak || Spacewatch || HYG || align=right | 3.2 km || 
|-id=148 bgcolor=#d6d6d6
| 315148 ||  || — || March 12, 2007 || Mount Lemmon || Mount Lemmon Survey || — || align=right | 2.3 km || 
|-id=149 bgcolor=#d6d6d6
| 315149 ||  || — || March 15, 2007 || Siding Spring || SSS || — || align=right | 5.0 km || 
|-id=150 bgcolor=#d6d6d6
| 315150 ||  || — || March 12, 2007 || Catalina || CSS || — || align=right | 3.7 km || 
|-id=151 bgcolor=#d6d6d6
| 315151 ||  || — || March 14, 2007 || Mount Lemmon || Mount Lemmon Survey || HYG || align=right | 3.6 km || 
|-id=152 bgcolor=#d6d6d6
| 315152 ||  || — || March 10, 2007 || Catalina || CSS || — || align=right | 5.8 km || 
|-id=153 bgcolor=#E9E9E9
| 315153 ||  || — || March 12, 2007 || Catalina || CSS || BRU || align=right | 4.2 km || 
|-id=154 bgcolor=#d6d6d6
| 315154 ||  || — || March 16, 2007 || Catalina || CSS || TIR || align=right | 4.0 km || 
|-id=155 bgcolor=#d6d6d6
| 315155 ||  || — || March 17, 2007 || Socorro || LINEAR || — || align=right | 3.7 km || 
|-id=156 bgcolor=#fefefe
| 315156 ||  || — || March 17, 2007 || Socorro || LINEAR || H || align=right data-sort-value="0.72" | 720 m || 
|-id=157 bgcolor=#d6d6d6
| 315157 ||  || — || March 19, 2007 || Mount Lemmon || Mount Lemmon Survey || HYG || align=right | 3.2 km || 
|-id=158 bgcolor=#d6d6d6
| 315158 ||  || — || March 20, 2007 || Mount Lemmon || Mount Lemmon Survey || — || align=right | 4.7 km || 
|-id=159 bgcolor=#d6d6d6
| 315159 ||  || — || February 26, 2007 || Mount Lemmon || Mount Lemmon Survey || HYG || align=right | 3.4 km || 
|-id=160 bgcolor=#d6d6d6
| 315160 ||  || — || March 20, 2007 || Kitt Peak || Spacewatch || — || align=right | 3.6 km || 
|-id=161 bgcolor=#d6d6d6
| 315161 ||  || — || March 20, 2007 || Kitt Peak || Spacewatch || THM || align=right | 3.0 km || 
|-id=162 bgcolor=#d6d6d6
| 315162 ||  || — || November 12, 1999 || Socorro || LINEAR || THM || align=right | 2.6 km || 
|-id=163 bgcolor=#d6d6d6
| 315163 ||  || — || March 20, 2007 || Mount Lemmon || Mount Lemmon Survey || EOS || align=right | 3.1 km || 
|-id=164 bgcolor=#d6d6d6
| 315164 ||  || — || March 20, 2007 || Kitt Peak || Spacewatch || — || align=right | 3.4 km || 
|-id=165 bgcolor=#d6d6d6
| 315165 ||  || — || March 26, 2007 || Kitt Peak || Spacewatch || — || align=right | 3.9 km || 
|-id=166 bgcolor=#d6d6d6
| 315166 Pawelmaksym ||  ||  || April 6, 2007 || Charleston || ARO || EOS || align=right | 2.6 km || 
|-id=167 bgcolor=#d6d6d6
| 315167 ||  || — || April 11, 2007 || Catalina || CSS || — || align=right | 5.0 km || 
|-id=168 bgcolor=#fefefe
| 315168 ||  || — || April 11, 2007 || Mount Lemmon || Mount Lemmon Survey || H || align=right data-sort-value="0.77" | 770 m || 
|-id=169 bgcolor=#d6d6d6
| 315169 ||  || — || April 11, 2007 || Catalina || CSS || EUP || align=right | 4.7 km || 
|-id=170 bgcolor=#d6d6d6
| 315170 ||  || — || April 14, 2007 || Kitt Peak || Spacewatch || HYG || align=right | 3.0 km || 
|-id=171 bgcolor=#d6d6d6
| 315171 ||  || — || April 15, 2007 || Mount Lemmon || Mount Lemmon Survey || — || align=right | 3.1 km || 
|-id=172 bgcolor=#d6d6d6
| 315172 ||  || — || January 3, 2006 || Socorro || LINEAR || — || align=right | 4.6 km || 
|-id=173 bgcolor=#fefefe
| 315173 ||  || — || April 18, 2007 || Socorro || LINEAR || H || align=right data-sort-value="0.65" | 650 m || 
|-id=174 bgcolor=#d6d6d6
| 315174 Sellek ||  ||  || March 20, 2007 || Catalina || CSS || THB || align=right | 4.9 km || 
|-id=175 bgcolor=#fefefe
| 315175 ||  || — || April 20, 2007 || Wildberg || R. Apitzsch || H || align=right data-sort-value="0.75" | 750 m || 
|-id=176 bgcolor=#d6d6d6
| 315176 ||  || — || April 22, 2007 || Mount Lemmon || Mount Lemmon Survey || — || align=right | 2.8 km || 
|-id=177 bgcolor=#d6d6d6
| 315177 ||  || — || April 20, 2007 || Mount Lemmon || Mount Lemmon Survey || HYG || align=right | 3.1 km || 
|-id=178 bgcolor=#d6d6d6
| 315178 ||  || — || April 22, 2007 || Mount Lemmon || Mount Lemmon Survey || — || align=right | 2.9 km || 
|-id=179 bgcolor=#d6d6d6
| 315179 ||  || — || April 23, 2007 || Catalina || CSS || — || align=right | 4.2 km || 
|-id=180 bgcolor=#d6d6d6
| 315180 ||  || — || April 25, 2007 || Mount Lemmon || Mount Lemmon Survey || — || align=right | 2.4 km || 
|-id=181 bgcolor=#d6d6d6
| 315181 ||  || — || March 20, 2007 || Anderson Mesa || LONEOS || — || align=right | 4.7 km || 
|-id=182 bgcolor=#d6d6d6
| 315182 ||  || — || May 9, 2007 || Mount Lemmon || Mount Lemmon Survey || — || align=right | 2.8 km || 
|-id=183 bgcolor=#fefefe
| 315183 ||  || — || May 10, 2007 || Catalina || CSS || H || align=right data-sort-value="0.86" | 860 m || 
|-id=184 bgcolor=#d6d6d6
| 315184 ||  || — || May 11, 2007 || Catalina || CSS || EUP || align=right | 5.4 km || 
|-id=185 bgcolor=#fefefe
| 315185 ||  || — || May 16, 2007 || Mount Lemmon || Mount Lemmon Survey || H || align=right data-sort-value="0.68" | 680 m || 
|-id=186 bgcolor=#FA8072
| 315186 Schade ||  ||  || June 11, 2007 || Mauna Kea || D. D. Balam || — || align=right | 1.1 km || 
|-id=187 bgcolor=#FA8072
| 315187 ||  || — || July 19, 2007 || La Sagra || OAM Obs. || — || align=right | 2.1 km || 
|-id=188 bgcolor=#d6d6d6
| 315188 ||  || — || August 8, 2007 || Socorro || LINEAR || — || align=right | 5.7 km || 
|-id=189 bgcolor=#fefefe
| 315189 ||  || — || August 9, 2007 || Socorro || LINEAR || — || align=right data-sort-value="0.82" | 820 m || 
|-id=190 bgcolor=#fefefe
| 315190 ||  || — || August 10, 2007 || Kitt Peak || Spacewatch || FLO || align=right data-sort-value="0.88" | 880 m || 
|-id=191 bgcolor=#fefefe
| 315191 ||  || — || August 10, 2007 || Kitt Peak || Spacewatch || FLO || align=right data-sort-value="0.66" | 660 m || 
|-id=192 bgcolor=#fefefe
| 315192 ||  || — || August 10, 2007 || Tiki || S. F. Hönig, N. Teamo || — || align=right data-sort-value="0.80" | 800 m || 
|-id=193 bgcolor=#fefefe
| 315193 ||  || — || August 13, 2007 || Socorro || LINEAR || FLO || align=right data-sort-value="0.66" | 660 m || 
|-id=194 bgcolor=#FA8072
| 315194 ||  || — || August 13, 2007 || Socorro || LINEAR || — || align=right data-sort-value="0.94" | 940 m || 
|-id=195 bgcolor=#C2FFFF
| 315195 ||  || — || August 13, 2007 || Socorro || LINEAR || L4 || align=right | 16 km || 
|-id=196 bgcolor=#fefefe
| 315196 ||  || — || August 9, 2007 || Socorro || LINEAR || FLO || align=right | 1.1 km || 
|-id=197 bgcolor=#fefefe
| 315197 ||  || — || August 10, 2007 || Kitt Peak || Spacewatch || — || align=right data-sort-value="0.66" | 660 m || 
|-id=198 bgcolor=#fefefe
| 315198 ||  || — || August 12, 2007 || Purple Mountain || PMO NEO || — || align=right data-sort-value="0.69" | 690 m || 
|-id=199 bgcolor=#fefefe
| 315199 ||  || — || August 16, 2007 || San Marcello || Pistoia Mountains Obs. || V || align=right data-sort-value="0.82" | 820 m || 
|-id=200 bgcolor=#fefefe
| 315200 ||  || — || August 22, 2007 || Socorro || LINEAR || — || align=right data-sort-value="0.98" | 980 m || 
|}

315201–315300 

|-bgcolor=#fefefe
| 315201 ||  || — || August 22, 2007 || Socorro || LINEAR || — || align=right | 1.1 km || 
|-id=202 bgcolor=#fefefe
| 315202 ||  || — || August 23, 2007 || Siding Spring || SSS || PHO || align=right | 1.4 km || 
|-id=203 bgcolor=#C2FFFF
| 315203 ||  || — || August 24, 2007 || Kitt Peak || Spacewatch || L4 || align=right | 9.3 km || 
|-id=204 bgcolor=#C2FFFF
| 315204 ||  || — || August 24, 2007 || Kitt Peak || Spacewatch || L4 || align=right | 9.9 km || 
|-id=205 bgcolor=#C2FFFF
| 315205 ||  || — || August 24, 2007 || Kitt Peak || Spacewatch || L4ERY || align=right | 9.0 km || 
|-id=206 bgcolor=#fefefe
| 315206 ||  || — || September 4, 2007 || Mayhill || A. Lowe || FLO || align=right data-sort-value="0.81" | 810 m || 
|-id=207 bgcolor=#fefefe
| 315207 ||  || — || September 3, 2007 || Catalina || CSS || — || align=right | 1.1 km || 
|-id=208 bgcolor=#C2FFFF
| 315208 ||  || — || September 3, 2007 || Catalina || CSS || L4 || align=right | 13 km || 
|-id=209 bgcolor=#fefefe
| 315209 ||  || — || September 8, 2007 || Mount Lemmon || Mount Lemmon Survey || FLO || align=right data-sort-value="0.84" | 840 m || 
|-id=210 bgcolor=#fefefe
| 315210 ||  || — || September 9, 2007 || Mount Lemmon || Mount Lemmon Survey || — || align=right data-sort-value="0.70" | 700 m || 
|-id=211 bgcolor=#fefefe
| 315211 ||  || — || September 9, 2007 || Kitt Peak || Spacewatch || — || align=right data-sort-value="0.91" | 910 m || 
|-id=212 bgcolor=#fefefe
| 315212 ||  || — || September 10, 2007 || Catalina || CSS || — || align=right data-sort-value="0.79" | 790 m || 
|-id=213 bgcolor=#fefefe
| 315213 ||  || — || September 10, 2007 || Mount Lemmon || Mount Lemmon Survey || NYS || align=right data-sort-value="0.77" | 770 m || 
|-id=214 bgcolor=#fefefe
| 315214 ||  || — || September 10, 2007 || Kitt Peak || Spacewatch || — || align=right data-sort-value="0.95" | 950 m || 
|-id=215 bgcolor=#fefefe
| 315215 ||  || — || September 10, 2007 || Kitt Peak || Spacewatch || FLO || align=right | 1.1 km || 
|-id=216 bgcolor=#fefefe
| 315216 ||  || — || September 11, 2007 || Catalina || CSS || — || align=right | 1.0 km || 
|-id=217 bgcolor=#fefefe
| 315217 ||  || — || September 11, 2007 || Kitt Peak || Spacewatch || NYS || align=right data-sort-value="0.59" | 590 m || 
|-id=218 bgcolor=#fefefe
| 315218 La Boetie ||  ||  || September 13, 2007 || Saint-Sulpice || B. Christophe || V || align=right data-sort-value="0.86" | 860 m || 
|-id=219 bgcolor=#fefefe
| 315219 ||  || — || September 14, 2007 || Anderson Mesa || LONEOS || NYS || align=right data-sort-value="0.63" | 630 m || 
|-id=220 bgcolor=#fefefe
| 315220 ||  || — || September 13, 2007 || Socorro || LINEAR || — || align=right data-sort-value="0.92" | 920 m || 
|-id=221 bgcolor=#fefefe
| 315221 ||  || — || September 12, 2007 || Catalina || CSS || NYS || align=right data-sort-value="0.76" | 760 m || 
|-id=222 bgcolor=#fefefe
| 315222 ||  || — || September 12, 2007 || Catalina || CSS || FLO || align=right data-sort-value="0.70" | 700 m || 
|-id=223 bgcolor=#fefefe
| 315223 ||  || — || September 10, 2007 || Catalina || CSS || — || align=right data-sort-value="0.87" | 870 m || 
|-id=224 bgcolor=#C2FFFF
| 315224 ||  || — || September 10, 2007 || Mount Lemmon || Mount Lemmon Survey || L4 || align=right | 9.8 km || 
|-id=225 bgcolor=#fefefe
| 315225 ||  || — || September 10, 2007 || Mount Lemmon || Mount Lemmon Survey || — || align=right data-sort-value="0.65" | 650 m || 
|-id=226 bgcolor=#fefefe
| 315226 ||  || — || September 10, 2007 || Kitt Peak || Spacewatch || V || align=right data-sort-value="0.72" | 720 m || 
|-id=227 bgcolor=#fefefe
| 315227 ||  || — || September 10, 2007 || Mount Lemmon || Mount Lemmon Survey || — || align=right data-sort-value="0.95" | 950 m || 
|-id=228 bgcolor=#fefefe
| 315228 ||  || — || September 11, 2007 || Kitt Peak || Spacewatch || — || align=right data-sort-value="0.68" | 680 m || 
|-id=229 bgcolor=#fefefe
| 315229 ||  || — || September 10, 2007 || Kitt Peak || Spacewatch || — || align=right data-sort-value="0.74" | 740 m || 
|-id=230 bgcolor=#fefefe
| 315230 ||  || — || September 12, 2007 || Anderson Mesa || LONEOS || FLO || align=right data-sort-value="0.74" | 740 m || 
|-id=231 bgcolor=#fefefe
| 315231 ||  || — || September 10, 2007 || Mount Lemmon || Mount Lemmon Survey || MAS || align=right | 1.00 km || 
|-id=232 bgcolor=#fefefe
| 315232 ||  || — || September 10, 2007 || Mount Lemmon || Mount Lemmon Survey || — || align=right data-sort-value="0.87" | 870 m || 
|-id=233 bgcolor=#FA8072
| 315233 ||  || — || September 12, 2007 || Catalina || CSS || — || align=right data-sort-value="0.91" | 910 m || 
|-id=234 bgcolor=#fefefe
| 315234 ||  || — || September 14, 2007 || Mount Lemmon || Mount Lemmon Survey || — || align=right data-sort-value="0.89" | 890 m || 
|-id=235 bgcolor=#fefefe
| 315235 ||  || — || September 14, 2007 || Kitt Peak || Spacewatch || — || align=right | 1.4 km || 
|-id=236 bgcolor=#fefefe
| 315236 ||  || — || September 15, 2007 || Kitt Peak || Spacewatch || — || align=right data-sort-value="0.97" | 970 m || 
|-id=237 bgcolor=#fefefe
| 315237 ||  || — || September 15, 2007 || Kitt Peak || Spacewatch || — || align=right | 1.0 km || 
|-id=238 bgcolor=#fefefe
| 315238 ||  || — || August 14, 2007 || Siding Spring || SSS || PHO || align=right | 1.4 km || 
|-id=239 bgcolor=#FA8072
| 315239 ||  || — || September 10, 2007 || Catalina || CSS || — || align=right data-sort-value="0.99" | 990 m || 
|-id=240 bgcolor=#fefefe
| 315240 ||  || — || September 11, 2007 || Purple Mountain || PMO NEO || — || align=right data-sort-value="0.77" | 770 m || 
|-id=241 bgcolor=#fefefe
| 315241 ||  || — || September 10, 2007 || Mount Lemmon || Mount Lemmon Survey || NYS || align=right data-sort-value="0.60" | 600 m || 
|-id=242 bgcolor=#fefefe
| 315242 ||  || — || September 14, 2007 || Mount Lemmon || Mount Lemmon Survey || MAS || align=right data-sort-value="0.65" | 650 m || 
|-id=243 bgcolor=#fefefe
| 315243 ||  || — || September 14, 2007 || Mount Lemmon || Mount Lemmon Survey || MAS || align=right data-sort-value="0.61" | 610 m || 
|-id=244 bgcolor=#fefefe
| 315244 ||  || — || September 14, 2007 || Mount Lemmon || Mount Lemmon Survey || V || align=right data-sort-value="0.67" | 670 m || 
|-id=245 bgcolor=#fefefe
| 315245 ||  || — || September 12, 2007 || Catalina || CSS || — || align=right data-sort-value="0.77" | 770 m || 
|-id=246 bgcolor=#fefefe
| 315246 ||  || — || September 15, 2007 || Lulin Observatory || LUSS || — || align=right data-sort-value="0.81" | 810 m || 
|-id=247 bgcolor=#fefefe
| 315247 ||  || — || September 12, 2007 || Catalina || CSS || V || align=right data-sort-value="0.96" | 960 m || 
|-id=248 bgcolor=#fefefe
| 315248 ||  || — || September 10, 2007 || Kitt Peak || Spacewatch || — || align=right data-sort-value="0.83" | 830 m || 
|-id=249 bgcolor=#fefefe
| 315249 ||  || — || September 16, 2007 || Socorro || LINEAR || — || align=right data-sort-value="0.89" | 890 m || 
|-id=250 bgcolor=#fefefe
| 315250 ||  || — || September 19, 2007 || Socorro || LINEAR || — || align=right data-sort-value="0.76" | 760 m || 
|-id=251 bgcolor=#fefefe
| 315251 ||  || — || September 16, 2007 || Taunus || E. Schwab, R. Kling || — || align=right data-sort-value="0.82" | 820 m || 
|-id=252 bgcolor=#fefefe
| 315252 ||  || — || October 7, 2007 || Calvin-Rehoboth || L. A. Molnar || — || align=right data-sort-value="0.73" | 730 m || 
|-id=253 bgcolor=#fefefe
| 315253 ||  || — || October 6, 2007 || Bergisch Gladbach || W. Bickel || — || align=right data-sort-value="0.97" | 970 m || 
|-id=254 bgcolor=#fefefe
| 315254 ||  || — || October 6, 2007 || Socorro || LINEAR || MAS || align=right | 1.1 km || 
|-id=255 bgcolor=#fefefe
| 315255 ||  || — || October 6, 2007 || Socorro || LINEAR || — || align=right data-sort-value="0.94" | 940 m || 
|-id=256 bgcolor=#fefefe
| 315256 ||  || — || October 6, 2007 || Socorro || LINEAR || — || align=right data-sort-value="0.99" | 990 m || 
|-id=257 bgcolor=#fefefe
| 315257 ||  || — || October 7, 2007 || Altschwendt || W. Ries || — || align=right data-sort-value="0.70" | 700 m || 
|-id=258 bgcolor=#fefefe
| 315258 ||  || — || October 8, 2007 || Goodricke-Pigott || R. A. Tucker || — || align=right data-sort-value="0.83" | 830 m || 
|-id=259 bgcolor=#fefefe
| 315259 ||  || — || October 8, 2007 || Goodricke-Pigott || R. A. Tucker || FLO || align=right | 1.1 km || 
|-id=260 bgcolor=#fefefe
| 315260 ||  || — || October 4, 2007 || Kitt Peak || Spacewatch || — || align=right data-sort-value="0.79" | 790 m || 
|-id=261 bgcolor=#fefefe
| 315261 ||  || — || October 6, 2007 || Kitt Peak || Spacewatch || V || align=right data-sort-value="0.73" | 730 m || 
|-id=262 bgcolor=#fefefe
| 315262 ||  || — || October 6, 2007 || Kitt Peak || Spacewatch || — || align=right | 1.3 km || 
|-id=263 bgcolor=#fefefe
| 315263 ||  || — || October 7, 2007 || Catalina || CSS || KLI || align=right | 3.2 km || 
|-id=264 bgcolor=#fefefe
| 315264 ||  || — || October 4, 2007 || Kitt Peak || Spacewatch || — || align=right data-sort-value="0.99" | 990 m || 
|-id=265 bgcolor=#fefefe
| 315265 ||  || — || October 4, 2007 || Kitt Peak || Spacewatch || NYS || align=right data-sort-value="0.86" | 860 m || 
|-id=266 bgcolor=#fefefe
| 315266 ||  || — || October 4, 2007 || Kitt Peak || Spacewatch || — || align=right data-sort-value="0.83" | 830 m || 
|-id=267 bgcolor=#fefefe
| 315267 ||  || — || October 7, 2007 || Mount Lemmon || Mount Lemmon Survey || — || align=right | 1.2 km || 
|-id=268 bgcolor=#fefefe
| 315268 ||  || — || October 7, 2007 || Mount Lemmon || Mount Lemmon Survey || MAS || align=right data-sort-value="0.73" | 730 m || 
|-id=269 bgcolor=#fefefe
| 315269 ||  || — || October 10, 2007 || Cordell-Lorenz || D. T. Durig || — || align=right data-sort-value="0.65" | 650 m || 
|-id=270 bgcolor=#fefefe
| 315270 ||  || — || October 14, 2007 || Mayhill || A. Lowe || FLO || align=right data-sort-value="0.76" | 760 m || 
|-id=271 bgcolor=#fefefe
| 315271 ||  || — || October 4, 2007 || Kitt Peak || Spacewatch || — || align=right data-sort-value="0.94" | 940 m || 
|-id=272 bgcolor=#fefefe
| 315272 ||  || — || October 7, 2007 || Catalina || CSS || — || align=right data-sort-value="0.89" | 890 m || 
|-id=273 bgcolor=#fefefe
| 315273 ||  || — || October 8, 2007 || Mount Lemmon || Mount Lemmon Survey || — || align=right data-sort-value="0.90" | 900 m || 
|-id=274 bgcolor=#fefefe
| 315274 ||  || — || October 8, 2007 || Mount Lemmon || Mount Lemmon Survey || — || align=right data-sort-value="0.85" | 850 m || 
|-id=275 bgcolor=#fefefe
| 315275 ||  || — || October 8, 2007 || Mount Lemmon || Mount Lemmon Survey || FLO || align=right data-sort-value="0.78" | 780 m || 
|-id=276 bgcolor=#fefefe
| 315276 Yurigradovsky ||  ||  || October 1, 2007 || Andrushivka || Andrushivka Obs. || — || align=right | 1.1 km || 
|-id=277 bgcolor=#fefefe
| 315277 ||  || — || October 15, 2007 || Taunus || S. Karge, R. Kling || V || align=right data-sort-value="0.85" | 850 m || 
|-id=278 bgcolor=#fefefe
| 315278 ||  || — || October 4, 2007 || Catalina || CSS || FLO || align=right data-sort-value="0.65" | 650 m || 
|-id=279 bgcolor=#fefefe
| 315279 ||  || — || October 7, 2007 || Catalina || CSS || FLO || align=right data-sort-value="0.70" | 700 m || 
|-id=280 bgcolor=#fefefe
| 315280 ||  || — || October 7, 2007 || Catalina || CSS || — || align=right data-sort-value="0.83" | 830 m || 
|-id=281 bgcolor=#fefefe
| 315281 ||  || — || October 8, 2007 || Catalina || CSS || V || align=right data-sort-value="0.89" | 890 m || 
|-id=282 bgcolor=#fefefe
| 315282 ||  || — || October 8, 2007 || Catalina || CSS || — || align=right | 1.3 km || 
|-id=283 bgcolor=#fefefe
| 315283 ||  || — || October 9, 2007 || Kitt Peak || Spacewatch || ERI || align=right | 1.6 km || 
|-id=284 bgcolor=#fefefe
| 315284 ||  || — || October 6, 2007 || Kitt Peak || Spacewatch || V || align=right data-sort-value="0.78" | 780 m || 
|-id=285 bgcolor=#fefefe
| 315285 ||  || — || October 6, 2007 || Kitt Peak || Spacewatch || NYS || align=right data-sort-value="0.78" | 780 m || 
|-id=286 bgcolor=#fefefe
| 315286 ||  || — || October 6, 2007 || Kitt Peak || Spacewatch || NYS || align=right data-sort-value="0.85" | 850 m || 
|-id=287 bgcolor=#fefefe
| 315287 ||  || — || October 6, 2007 || Kitt Peak || Spacewatch || NYS || align=right data-sort-value="0.63" | 630 m || 
|-id=288 bgcolor=#fefefe
| 315288 ||  || — || October 6, 2007 || Kitt Peak || Spacewatch || — || align=right data-sort-value="0.99" | 990 m || 
|-id=289 bgcolor=#fefefe
| 315289 ||  || — || October 7, 2007 || Mount Lemmon || Mount Lemmon Survey || — || align=right data-sort-value="0.70" | 700 m || 
|-id=290 bgcolor=#fefefe
| 315290 ||  || — || October 6, 2007 || Socorro || LINEAR || — || align=right data-sort-value="0.87" | 870 m || 
|-id=291 bgcolor=#fefefe
| 315291 ||  || — || October 7, 2007 || Socorro || LINEAR || — || align=right | 2.1 km || 
|-id=292 bgcolor=#fefefe
| 315292 ||  || — || October 7, 2007 || Socorro || LINEAR || — || align=right data-sort-value="0.94" | 940 m || 
|-id=293 bgcolor=#fefefe
| 315293 ||  || — || October 9, 2007 || Socorro || LINEAR || FLO || align=right data-sort-value="0.65" | 650 m || 
|-id=294 bgcolor=#fefefe
| 315294 ||  || — || October 9, 2007 || Socorro || LINEAR || V || align=right data-sort-value="0.98" | 980 m || 
|-id=295 bgcolor=#fefefe
| 315295 ||  || — || October 9, 2007 || Socorro || LINEAR || FLO || align=right data-sort-value="0.66" | 660 m || 
|-id=296 bgcolor=#fefefe
| 315296 ||  || — || October 9, 2007 || Socorro || LINEAR || — || align=right | 1.5 km || 
|-id=297 bgcolor=#fefefe
| 315297 ||  || — || October 9, 2007 || Socorro || LINEAR || — || align=right data-sort-value="0.87" | 870 m || 
|-id=298 bgcolor=#E9E9E9
| 315298 ||  || — || October 9, 2007 || Socorro || LINEAR || — || align=right | 2.5 km || 
|-id=299 bgcolor=#fefefe
| 315299 ||  || — || October 11, 2007 || Socorro || LINEAR || FLO || align=right data-sort-value="0.69" | 690 m || 
|-id=300 bgcolor=#fefefe
| 315300 ||  || — || October 12, 2007 || Socorro || LINEAR || NYS || align=right data-sort-value="0.85" | 850 m || 
|}

315301–315400 

|-bgcolor=#fefefe
| 315301 ||  || — || October 4, 2007 || Catalina || CSS || — || align=right data-sort-value="0.98" | 980 m || 
|-id=302 bgcolor=#fefefe
| 315302 ||  || — || October 6, 2007 || Kitt Peak || Spacewatch || MAS || align=right data-sort-value="0.84" | 840 m || 
|-id=303 bgcolor=#fefefe
| 315303 ||  || — || October 13, 2007 || Socorro || LINEAR || FLO || align=right data-sort-value="0.84" | 840 m || 
|-id=304 bgcolor=#fefefe
| 315304 ||  || — || October 8, 2007 || Kitt Peak || Spacewatch || — || align=right data-sort-value="0.77" | 770 m || 
|-id=305 bgcolor=#fefefe
| 315305 ||  || — || October 8, 2007 || Mount Lemmon || Mount Lemmon Survey || FLO || align=right data-sort-value="0.76" | 760 m || 
|-id=306 bgcolor=#fefefe
| 315306 ||  || — || October 7, 2007 || Kitt Peak || Spacewatch || V || align=right data-sort-value="0.78" | 780 m || 
|-id=307 bgcolor=#fefefe
| 315307 ||  || — || October 7, 2007 || Kitt Peak || Spacewatch || NYS || align=right data-sort-value="0.66" | 660 m || 
|-id=308 bgcolor=#fefefe
| 315308 ||  || — || October 7, 2007 || Kitt Peak || Spacewatch || — || align=right | 1.1 km || 
|-id=309 bgcolor=#fefefe
| 315309 ||  || — || October 8, 2007 || Kitt Peak || Spacewatch || NYS || align=right data-sort-value="0.81" | 810 m || 
|-id=310 bgcolor=#fefefe
| 315310 ||  || — || October 8, 2007 || Kitt Peak || Spacewatch || — || align=right | 1.2 km || 
|-id=311 bgcolor=#fefefe
| 315311 ||  || — || October 9, 2007 || Mount Lemmon || Mount Lemmon Survey || — || align=right data-sort-value="0.82" | 820 m || 
|-id=312 bgcolor=#fefefe
| 315312 ||  || — || October 8, 2007 || Catalina || CSS || V || align=right data-sort-value="0.94" | 940 m || 
|-id=313 bgcolor=#fefefe
| 315313 ||  || — || October 10, 2007 || Kitt Peak || Spacewatch || — || align=right data-sort-value="0.66" | 660 m || 
|-id=314 bgcolor=#fefefe
| 315314 ||  || — || October 9, 2007 || Kitt Peak || Spacewatch || — || align=right | 1.0 km || 
|-id=315 bgcolor=#fefefe
| 315315 ||  || — || October 12, 2007 || Mount Lemmon || Mount Lemmon Survey || — || align=right | 1.1 km || 
|-id=316 bgcolor=#fefefe
| 315316 ||  || — || October 10, 2007 || Mount Lemmon || Mount Lemmon Survey || FLO || align=right data-sort-value="0.72" | 720 m || 
|-id=317 bgcolor=#fefefe
| 315317 ||  || — || October 12, 2007 || Kitt Peak || Spacewatch || — || align=right data-sort-value="0.82" | 820 m || 
|-id=318 bgcolor=#fefefe
| 315318 ||  || — || October 10, 2007 || Mount Lemmon || Mount Lemmon Survey || NYS || align=right data-sort-value="0.68" | 680 m || 
|-id=319 bgcolor=#fefefe
| 315319 ||  || — || October 12, 2007 || Kitt Peak || Spacewatch || — || align=right | 1.1 km || 
|-id=320 bgcolor=#fefefe
| 315320 ||  || — || October 11, 2007 || Kitt Peak || Spacewatch || — || align=right data-sort-value="0.80" | 800 m || 
|-id=321 bgcolor=#fefefe
| 315321 ||  || — || October 11, 2007 || Kitt Peak || Spacewatch || — || align=right data-sort-value="0.77" | 770 m || 
|-id=322 bgcolor=#fefefe
| 315322 ||  || — || October 13, 2007 || Mount Lemmon || Mount Lemmon Survey || FLO || align=right data-sort-value="0.77" | 770 m || 
|-id=323 bgcolor=#fefefe
| 315323 ||  || — || October 8, 2007 || Mount Lemmon || Mount Lemmon Survey || — || align=right data-sort-value="0.91" | 910 m || 
|-id=324 bgcolor=#fefefe
| 315324 ||  || — || October 10, 2007 || Catalina || CSS || — || align=right | 1.2 km || 
|-id=325 bgcolor=#fefefe
| 315325 ||  || — || October 10, 2007 || Anderson Mesa || LONEOS || — || align=right data-sort-value="0.95" | 950 m || 
|-id=326 bgcolor=#fefefe
| 315326 ||  || — || October 10, 2007 || Mount Lemmon || Mount Lemmon Survey || NYS || align=right data-sort-value="0.92" | 920 m || 
|-id=327 bgcolor=#fefefe
| 315327 ||  || — || October 14, 2007 || Kitt Peak || Spacewatch || — || align=right data-sort-value="0.82" | 820 m || 
|-id=328 bgcolor=#fefefe
| 315328 ||  || — || October 13, 2007 || Mount Lemmon || Mount Lemmon Survey || — || align=right data-sort-value="0.89" | 890 m || 
|-id=329 bgcolor=#fefefe
| 315329 ||  || — || October 14, 2007 || Kitt Peak || Spacewatch || — || align=right data-sort-value="0.78" | 780 m || 
|-id=330 bgcolor=#fefefe
| 315330 ||  || — || October 14, 2007 || Kitt Peak || Spacewatch || MAS || align=right data-sort-value="0.84" | 840 m || 
|-id=331 bgcolor=#fefefe
| 315331 ||  || — || October 15, 2007 || Catalina || CSS || — || align=right data-sort-value="0.89" | 890 m || 
|-id=332 bgcolor=#fefefe
| 315332 ||  || — || October 15, 2007 || Kitt Peak || Spacewatch || NYS || align=right data-sort-value="0.73" | 730 m || 
|-id=333 bgcolor=#fefefe
| 315333 ||  || — || October 13, 2007 || Catalina || CSS || — || align=right | 1.4 km || 
|-id=334 bgcolor=#fefefe
| 315334 ||  || — || October 13, 2007 || Catalina || CSS || — || align=right | 1.1 km || 
|-id=335 bgcolor=#fefefe
| 315335 ||  || — || October 13, 2007 || Catalina || CSS || — || align=right data-sort-value="0.94" | 940 m || 
|-id=336 bgcolor=#fefefe
| 315336 ||  || — || October 4, 2007 || Kitt Peak || Spacewatch || — || align=right | 1.0 km || 
|-id=337 bgcolor=#fefefe
| 315337 ||  || — || October 11, 2007 || Kitt Peak || Spacewatch || V || align=right data-sort-value="0.80" | 800 m || 
|-id=338 bgcolor=#fefefe
| 315338 ||  || — || October 15, 2007 || Kitt Peak || Spacewatch || — || align=right data-sort-value="0.71" | 710 m || 
|-id=339 bgcolor=#fefefe
| 315339 ||  || — || February 15, 2002 || Haleakala || NEAT || V || align=right data-sort-value="0.90" | 900 m || 
|-id=340 bgcolor=#fefefe
| 315340 ||  || — || October 6, 2007 || Kitt Peak || Spacewatch || — || align=right data-sort-value="0.77" | 770 m || 
|-id=341 bgcolor=#fefefe
| 315341 ||  || — || October 7, 2007 || Kitt Peak || Spacewatch || — || align=right data-sort-value="0.83" | 830 m || 
|-id=342 bgcolor=#fefefe
| 315342 ||  || — || October 15, 2007 || Mount Lemmon || Mount Lemmon Survey || — || align=right | 1.0 km || 
|-id=343 bgcolor=#fefefe
| 315343 ||  || — || October 16, 2007 || 7300 Observatory || W. K. Y. Yeung || — || align=right data-sort-value="0.87" | 870 m || 
|-id=344 bgcolor=#fefefe
| 315344 ||  || — || October 16, 2007 || Bisei SG Center || BATTeRS || FLO || align=right data-sort-value="0.76" | 760 m || 
|-id=345 bgcolor=#fefefe
| 315345 ||  || — || October 17, 2007 || Anderson Mesa || LONEOS || V || align=right data-sort-value="0.89" | 890 m || 
|-id=346 bgcolor=#fefefe
| 315346 ||  || — || October 18, 2007 || Anderson Mesa || LONEOS || FLO || align=right data-sort-value="0.79" | 790 m || 
|-id=347 bgcolor=#fefefe
| 315347 ||  || — || October 19, 2007 || Anderson Mesa || LONEOS || FLO || align=right | 1.0 km || 
|-id=348 bgcolor=#fefefe
| 315348 ||  || — || October 19, 2007 || Anderson Mesa || LONEOS || FLO || align=right data-sort-value="0.81" | 810 m || 
|-id=349 bgcolor=#fefefe
| 315349 ||  || — || October 19, 2007 || Socorro || LINEAR || NYS || align=right data-sort-value="0.87" | 870 m || 
|-id=350 bgcolor=#fefefe
| 315350 ||  || — || October 16, 2007 || Kitt Peak || Spacewatch || MAS || align=right data-sort-value="0.79" | 790 m || 
|-id=351 bgcolor=#fefefe
| 315351 ||  || — || October 17, 2007 || Catalina || CSS || CHL || align=right | 2.0 km || 
|-id=352 bgcolor=#fefefe
| 315352 ||  || — || October 18, 2007 || Kitt Peak || Spacewatch || — || align=right data-sort-value="0.92" | 920 m || 
|-id=353 bgcolor=#fefefe
| 315353 ||  || — || October 18, 2007 || Mount Lemmon || Mount Lemmon Survey || FLO || align=right data-sort-value="0.75" | 750 m || 
|-id=354 bgcolor=#fefefe
| 315354 ||  || — || October 19, 2007 || Kitt Peak || Spacewatch || NYS || align=right data-sort-value="0.61" | 610 m || 
|-id=355 bgcolor=#fefefe
| 315355 ||  || — || October 20, 2007 || Catalina || CSS || NYS || align=right data-sort-value="0.67" | 670 m || 
|-id=356 bgcolor=#fefefe
| 315356 ||  || — || October 30, 2007 || Kitt Peak || Spacewatch || — || align=right data-sort-value="0.85" | 850 m || 
|-id=357 bgcolor=#fefefe
| 315357 ||  || — || October 30, 2007 || Mount Lemmon || Mount Lemmon Survey || — || align=right data-sort-value="0.76" | 760 m || 
|-id=358 bgcolor=#fefefe
| 315358 ||  || — || October 30, 2007 || Mount Lemmon || Mount Lemmon Survey || — || align=right | 1.0 km || 
|-id=359 bgcolor=#fefefe
| 315359 ||  || — || October 30, 2007 || Mount Lemmon || Mount Lemmon Survey || MAS || align=right data-sort-value="0.67" | 670 m || 
|-id=360 bgcolor=#fefefe
| 315360 ||  || — || October 31, 2007 || Kitt Peak || Spacewatch || — || align=right data-sort-value="0.77" | 770 m || 
|-id=361 bgcolor=#fefefe
| 315361 ||  || — || October 30, 2007 || Mount Lemmon || Mount Lemmon Survey || — || align=right data-sort-value="0.79" | 790 m || 
|-id=362 bgcolor=#fefefe
| 315362 ||  || — || October 30, 2007 || Kitt Peak || Spacewatch || NYS || align=right data-sort-value="0.66" | 660 m || 
|-id=363 bgcolor=#fefefe
| 315363 ||  || — || October 20, 2007 || Mount Lemmon || Mount Lemmon Survey || V || align=right data-sort-value="0.97" | 970 m || 
|-id=364 bgcolor=#E9E9E9
| 315364 ||  || — || October 26, 2007 || Mount Lemmon || Mount Lemmon Survey || — || align=right | 1.7 km || 
|-id=365 bgcolor=#fefefe
| 315365 ||  || — || November 1, 2007 || Mayhill || A. Lowe || NYS || align=right data-sort-value="0.96" | 960 m || 
|-id=366 bgcolor=#fefefe
| 315366 ||  || — || November 1, 2007 || Socorro || LINEAR || — || align=right data-sort-value="0.94" | 940 m || 
|-id=367 bgcolor=#fefefe
| 315367 ||  || — || November 1, 2007 || Socorro || LINEAR || — || align=right data-sort-value="0.80" | 800 m || 
|-id=368 bgcolor=#C2FFFF
| 315368 ||  || — || November 2, 2007 || Mount Lemmon || Mount Lemmon Survey || L4 || align=right | 11 km || 
|-id=369 bgcolor=#C2FFFF
| 315369 ||  || — || November 3, 2007 || Mount Lemmon || Mount Lemmon Survey || L4 || align=right | 12 km || 
|-id=370 bgcolor=#fefefe
| 315370 ||  || — || November 3, 2007 || 7300 || W. K. Y. Yeung || — || align=right | 1.1 km || 
|-id=371 bgcolor=#fefefe
| 315371 ||  || — || November 1, 2007 || Mount Lemmon || Mount Lemmon Survey || MAS || align=right data-sort-value="0.74" | 740 m || 
|-id=372 bgcolor=#fefefe
| 315372 ||  || — || November 2, 2007 || Mount Lemmon || Mount Lemmon Survey || — || align=right data-sort-value="0.78" | 780 m || 
|-id=373 bgcolor=#fefefe
| 315373 ||  || — || November 2, 2007 || Catalina || CSS || — || align=right data-sort-value="0.93" | 930 m || 
|-id=374 bgcolor=#fefefe
| 315374 ||  || — || November 3, 2007 || Kitt Peak || Spacewatch || FLO || align=right data-sort-value="0.64" | 640 m || 
|-id=375 bgcolor=#E9E9E9
| 315375 ||  || — || November 3, 2007 || Mount Lemmon || Mount Lemmon Survey || — || align=right | 1.3 km || 
|-id=376 bgcolor=#E9E9E9
| 315376 ||  || — || November 1, 2007 || Kitt Peak || Spacewatch || — || align=right | 2.6 km || 
|-id=377 bgcolor=#fefefe
| 315377 ||  || — || November 1, 2007 || Kitt Peak || Spacewatch || — || align=right data-sort-value="0.88" | 880 m || 
|-id=378 bgcolor=#E9E9E9
| 315378 ||  || — || November 1, 2007 || Kitt Peak || Spacewatch || GAL || align=right | 2.4 km || 
|-id=379 bgcolor=#fefefe
| 315379 ||  || — || November 1, 2007 || Kitt Peak || Spacewatch || NYS || align=right data-sort-value="0.68" | 680 m || 
|-id=380 bgcolor=#fefefe
| 315380 ||  || — || November 1, 2007 || Kitt Peak || Spacewatch || V || align=right data-sort-value="0.82" | 820 m || 
|-id=381 bgcolor=#fefefe
| 315381 ||  || — || November 1, 2007 || Kitt Peak || Spacewatch || — || align=right data-sort-value="0.87" | 870 m || 
|-id=382 bgcolor=#fefefe
| 315382 ||  || — || November 1, 2007 || Kitt Peak || Spacewatch || — || align=right data-sort-value="0.83" | 830 m || 
|-id=383 bgcolor=#fefefe
| 315383 ||  || — || November 2, 2007 || Kitt Peak || Spacewatch || — || align=right data-sort-value="0.72" | 720 m || 
|-id=384 bgcolor=#fefefe
| 315384 ||  || — || November 1, 2007 || Kitt Peak || Spacewatch || — || align=right data-sort-value="0.83" | 830 m || 
|-id=385 bgcolor=#fefefe
| 315385 ||  || — || November 4, 2007 || Mount Lemmon || Mount Lemmon Survey || V || align=right data-sort-value="0.85" | 850 m || 
|-id=386 bgcolor=#fefefe
| 315386 ||  || — || November 2, 2007 || Socorro || LINEAR || V || align=right data-sort-value="0.72" | 720 m || 
|-id=387 bgcolor=#fefefe
| 315387 ||  || — || November 4, 2007 || Socorro || LINEAR || NYS || align=right data-sort-value="0.68" | 680 m || 
|-id=388 bgcolor=#fefefe
| 315388 ||  || — || November 7, 2007 || Bisei SG Center || BATTeRS || NYS || align=right data-sort-value="0.78" | 780 m || 
|-id=389 bgcolor=#fefefe
| 315389 ||  || — || January 17, 2005 || Kitt Peak || Spacewatch || — || align=right data-sort-value="0.79" | 790 m || 
|-id=390 bgcolor=#fefefe
| 315390 ||  || — || November 3, 2007 || Kitt Peak || Spacewatch || MAS || align=right data-sort-value="0.78" | 780 m || 
|-id=391 bgcolor=#fefefe
| 315391 ||  || — || November 3, 2007 || Kitt Peak || Spacewatch || NYS || align=right data-sort-value="0.68" | 680 m || 
|-id=392 bgcolor=#fefefe
| 315392 ||  || — || November 3, 2007 || Kitt Peak || Spacewatch || NYS || align=right data-sort-value="0.57" | 570 m || 
|-id=393 bgcolor=#fefefe
| 315393 ||  || — || November 3, 2007 || Kitt Peak || Spacewatch || MAS || align=right data-sort-value="0.70" | 700 m || 
|-id=394 bgcolor=#fefefe
| 315394 ||  || — || November 4, 2007 || Kitt Peak || Spacewatch || NYS || align=right data-sort-value="0.69" | 690 m || 
|-id=395 bgcolor=#fefefe
| 315395 ||  || — || November 5, 2007 || Kitt Peak || Spacewatch || FLO || align=right data-sort-value="0.75" | 750 m || 
|-id=396 bgcolor=#fefefe
| 315396 ||  || — || November 5, 2007 || Purple Mountain || PMO NEO || V || align=right data-sort-value="0.70" | 700 m || 
|-id=397 bgcolor=#fefefe
| 315397 ||  || — || November 3, 2007 || Mount Lemmon || Mount Lemmon Survey || — || align=right | 1.3 km || 
|-id=398 bgcolor=#fefefe
| 315398 ||  || — || November 2, 2007 || Kitt Peak || Spacewatch || V || align=right data-sort-value="0.69" | 690 m || 
|-id=399 bgcolor=#fefefe
| 315399 ||  || — || November 4, 2007 || Mount Lemmon || Mount Lemmon Survey || — || align=right data-sort-value="0.78" | 780 m || 
|-id=400 bgcolor=#fefefe
| 315400 ||  || — || November 4, 2007 || Kitt Peak || Spacewatch || — || align=right data-sort-value="0.96" | 960 m || 
|}

315401–315500 

|-bgcolor=#fefefe
| 315401 ||  || — || November 4, 2007 || Kitt Peak || Spacewatch || — || align=right | 1.0 km || 
|-id=402 bgcolor=#fefefe
| 315402 ||  || — || November 4, 2007 || Kitt Peak || Spacewatch || FLO || align=right data-sort-value="0.86" | 860 m || 
|-id=403 bgcolor=#fefefe
| 315403 ||  || — || November 5, 2007 || Kitt Peak || Spacewatch || NYS || align=right data-sort-value="0.76" | 760 m || 
|-id=404 bgcolor=#E9E9E9
| 315404 ||  || — || November 7, 2007 || Mount Lemmon || Mount Lemmon Survey || — || align=right | 2.8 km || 
|-id=405 bgcolor=#fefefe
| 315405 ||  || — || November 12, 2007 || Socorro || LINEAR || PHO || align=right | 3.4 km || 
|-id=406 bgcolor=#fefefe
| 315406 ||  || — || November 6, 2007 || Kitt Peak || Spacewatch || — || align=right data-sort-value="0.84" | 840 m || 
|-id=407 bgcolor=#E9E9E9
| 315407 ||  || — || November 4, 2007 || Mount Lemmon || Mount Lemmon Survey || — || align=right | 1.1 km || 
|-id=408 bgcolor=#fefefe
| 315408 ||  || — || November 4, 2007 || Mount Lemmon || Mount Lemmon Survey || — || align=right | 1.3 km || 
|-id=409 bgcolor=#fefefe
| 315409 ||  || — || November 5, 2007 || Mount Lemmon || Mount Lemmon Survey || V || align=right data-sort-value="0.74" | 740 m || 
|-id=410 bgcolor=#E9E9E9
| 315410 ||  || — || November 7, 2007 || Mount Lemmon || Mount Lemmon Survey || JUN || align=right | 1.3 km || 
|-id=411 bgcolor=#fefefe
| 315411 ||  || — || November 8, 2007 || Mount Lemmon || Mount Lemmon Survey || V || align=right data-sort-value="0.72" | 720 m || 
|-id=412 bgcolor=#E9E9E9
| 315412 ||  || — || November 8, 2007 || Mount Lemmon || Mount Lemmon Survey || — || align=right | 1.1 km || 
|-id=413 bgcolor=#fefefe
| 315413 ||  || — || November 9, 2007 || Kitt Peak || Spacewatch || FLO || align=right data-sort-value="0.81" | 810 m || 
|-id=414 bgcolor=#fefefe
| 315414 ||  || — || November 12, 2007 || Catalina || CSS || — || align=right data-sort-value="0.92" | 920 m || 
|-id=415 bgcolor=#fefefe
| 315415 ||  || — || November 7, 2007 || Kitt Peak || Spacewatch || — || align=right data-sort-value="0.81" | 810 m || 
|-id=416 bgcolor=#fefefe
| 315416 ||  || — || November 8, 2007 || Kitt Peak || Spacewatch || NYS || align=right data-sort-value="0.77" | 770 m || 
|-id=417 bgcolor=#fefefe
| 315417 ||  || — || November 12, 2007 || Catalina || CSS || — || align=right data-sort-value="0.91" | 910 m || 
|-id=418 bgcolor=#E9E9E9
| 315418 ||  || — || November 11, 2007 || Mount Lemmon || Mount Lemmon Survey || MAR || align=right | 1.4 km || 
|-id=419 bgcolor=#fefefe
| 315419 ||  || — || November 14, 2007 || Bisei SG Center || BATTeRS || MAS || align=right data-sort-value="0.74" | 740 m || 
|-id=420 bgcolor=#fefefe
| 315420 ||  || — || November 8, 2007 || Catalina || CSS || V || align=right data-sort-value="0.73" | 730 m || 
|-id=421 bgcolor=#fefefe
| 315421 ||  || — || November 13, 2007 || Mount Lemmon || Mount Lemmon Survey || — || align=right data-sort-value="0.94" | 940 m || 
|-id=422 bgcolor=#fefefe
| 315422 ||  || — || November 12, 2007 || Mount Lemmon || Mount Lemmon Survey || FLO || align=right data-sort-value="0.83" | 830 m || 
|-id=423 bgcolor=#fefefe
| 315423 ||  || — || November 12, 2007 || Mount Lemmon || Mount Lemmon Survey || — || align=right | 1.0 km || 
|-id=424 bgcolor=#fefefe
| 315424 ||  || — || November 15, 2007 || Anderson Mesa || LONEOS || — || align=right data-sort-value="0.87" | 870 m || 
|-id=425 bgcolor=#fefefe
| 315425 ||  || — || November 13, 2007 || Kitt Peak || Spacewatch || — || align=right | 1.0 km || 
|-id=426 bgcolor=#fefefe
| 315426 ||  || — || November 15, 2007 || Mount Lemmon || Mount Lemmon Survey || — || align=right data-sort-value="0.88" | 880 m || 
|-id=427 bgcolor=#fefefe
| 315427 ||  || — || November 13, 2007 || Mount Lemmon || Mount Lemmon Survey || — || align=right | 1.0 km || 
|-id=428 bgcolor=#fefefe
| 315428 ||  || — || November 14, 2007 || Kitt Peak || Spacewatch || V || align=right data-sort-value="0.79" | 790 m || 
|-id=429 bgcolor=#fefefe
| 315429 ||  || — || November 14, 2007 || Kitt Peak || Spacewatch || MAS || align=right data-sort-value="0.63" | 630 m || 
|-id=430 bgcolor=#fefefe
| 315430 ||  || — || November 14, 2007 || Kitt Peak || Spacewatch || V || align=right data-sort-value="0.93" | 930 m || 
|-id=431 bgcolor=#fefefe
| 315431 ||  || — || November 15, 2007 || Catalina || CSS || — || align=right | 1.2 km || 
|-id=432 bgcolor=#E9E9E9
| 315432 ||  || — || November 14, 2007 || Kitt Peak || Spacewatch || — || align=right | 1.5 km || 
|-id=433 bgcolor=#fefefe
| 315433 ||  || — || November 13, 2007 || Catalina || CSS || V || align=right data-sort-value="0.73" | 730 m || 
|-id=434 bgcolor=#fefefe
| 315434 ||  || — || November 11, 2007 || Anderson Mesa || LONEOS || — || align=right | 1.0 km || 
|-id=435 bgcolor=#fefefe
| 315435 ||  || — || November 11, 2007 || Bisei SG Center || BATTeRS || — || align=right data-sort-value="0.98" | 980 m || 
|-id=436 bgcolor=#E9E9E9
| 315436 ||  || — || November 8, 2007 || Mount Lemmon || Mount Lemmon Survey || RAF || align=right data-sort-value="0.99" | 990 m || 
|-id=437 bgcolor=#E9E9E9
| 315437 ||  || — || November 3, 2007 || Kitt Peak || Spacewatch || — || align=right data-sort-value="0.97" | 970 m || 
|-id=438 bgcolor=#fefefe
| 315438 ||  || — || November 4, 2007 || Kitt Peak || Spacewatch || — || align=right | 1.1 km || 
|-id=439 bgcolor=#E9E9E9
| 315439 ||  || — || November 14, 2007 || Mount Lemmon || Mount Lemmon Survey || — || align=right | 1.8 km || 
|-id=440 bgcolor=#FA8072
| 315440 ||  || — || November 17, 2007 || Mayhill || A. Lowe || — || align=right | 1.0 km || 
|-id=441 bgcolor=#fefefe
| 315441 ||  || — || March 25, 2006 || Kitt Peak || Spacewatch || FLO || align=right data-sort-value="0.88" | 880 m || 
|-id=442 bgcolor=#fefefe
| 315442 ||  || — || November 18, 2007 || Mount Lemmon || Mount Lemmon Survey || NYS || align=right data-sort-value="0.74" | 740 m || 
|-id=443 bgcolor=#fefefe
| 315443 ||  || — || November 18, 2007 || Mount Lemmon || Mount Lemmon Survey || ERI || align=right | 1.7 km || 
|-id=444 bgcolor=#fefefe
| 315444 ||  || — || November 18, 2007 || Mount Lemmon || Mount Lemmon Survey || — || align=right data-sort-value="0.87" | 870 m || 
|-id=445 bgcolor=#E9E9E9
| 315445 ||  || — || November 18, 2007 || Mount Lemmon || Mount Lemmon Survey || — || align=right | 1.0 km || 
|-id=446 bgcolor=#E9E9E9
| 315446 ||  || — || November 19, 2007 || Mount Lemmon || Mount Lemmon Survey || — || align=right | 1.8 km || 
|-id=447 bgcolor=#fefefe
| 315447 ||  || — || November 18, 2007 || Kitt Peak || Spacewatch || MAS || align=right data-sort-value="0.64" | 640 m || 
|-id=448 bgcolor=#fefefe
| 315448 ||  || — || November 18, 2007 || Kitt Peak || Spacewatch || — || align=right | 1.0 km || 
|-id=449 bgcolor=#E9E9E9
| 315449 ||  || — || December 3, 2007 || Catalina || CSS || — || align=right | 2.5 km || 
|-id=450 bgcolor=#fefefe
| 315450 ||  || — || December 4, 2007 || Catalina || CSS || — || align=right data-sort-value="0.81" | 810 m || 
|-id=451 bgcolor=#fefefe
| 315451 ||  || — || December 4, 2007 || Mount Lemmon || Mount Lemmon Survey || — || align=right | 1.2 km || 
|-id=452 bgcolor=#fefefe
| 315452 ||  || — || December 4, 2007 || Kitt Peak || Spacewatch || FLO || align=right data-sort-value="0.69" | 690 m || 
|-id=453 bgcolor=#E9E9E9
| 315453 ||  || — || December 4, 2007 || Catalina || CSS || — || align=right | 1.6 km || 
|-id=454 bgcolor=#fefefe
| 315454 ||  || — || December 5, 2007 || Bisei SG Center || BATTeRS || PHO || align=right | 1.6 km || 
|-id=455 bgcolor=#fefefe
| 315455 ||  || — || December 12, 2007 || La Sagra || OAM Obs. || MAS || align=right data-sort-value="0.96" | 960 m || 
|-id=456 bgcolor=#fefefe
| 315456 ||  || — || December 10, 2007 || Socorro || LINEAR || — || align=right | 1.3 km || 
|-id=457 bgcolor=#fefefe
| 315457 ||  || — || December 14, 2007 || Purple Mountain || PMO NEO || — || align=right data-sort-value="0.85" | 850 m || 
|-id=458 bgcolor=#E9E9E9
| 315458 ||  || — || December 15, 2007 || Catalina || CSS || — || align=right | 1.6 km || 
|-id=459 bgcolor=#E9E9E9
| 315459 ||  || — || December 15, 2007 || Catalina || CSS || — || align=right | 1.5 km || 
|-id=460 bgcolor=#fefefe
| 315460 ||  || — || December 15, 2007 || Kitt Peak || Spacewatch || — || align=right | 1.2 km || 
|-id=461 bgcolor=#fefefe
| 315461 ||  || — || December 13, 2007 || Socorro || LINEAR || NYS || align=right data-sort-value="0.86" | 860 m || 
|-id=462 bgcolor=#E9E9E9
| 315462 ||  || — || December 14, 2007 || Mount Lemmon || Mount Lemmon Survey || — || align=right data-sort-value="0.79" | 790 m || 
|-id=463 bgcolor=#fefefe
| 315463 ||  || — || December 4, 2007 || Mount Lemmon || Mount Lemmon Survey || MAS || align=right data-sort-value="0.67" | 670 m || 
|-id=464 bgcolor=#fefefe
| 315464 ||  || — || December 4, 2007 || Mount Lemmon || Mount Lemmon Survey || — || align=right | 1.1 km || 
|-id=465 bgcolor=#E9E9E9
| 315465 ||  || — || December 15, 2007 || Mount Lemmon || Mount Lemmon Survey || HNS || align=right | 1.4 km || 
|-id=466 bgcolor=#E9E9E9
| 315466 ||  || — || December 14, 2007 || Mount Lemmon || Mount Lemmon Survey || — || align=right | 1.5 km || 
|-id=467 bgcolor=#fefefe
| 315467 ||  || — || December 4, 2007 || Mount Lemmon || Mount Lemmon Survey || MAS || align=right data-sort-value="0.89" | 890 m || 
|-id=468 bgcolor=#fefefe
| 315468 ||  || — || September 30, 2003 || Kitt Peak || Spacewatch || NYS || align=right data-sort-value="0.63" | 630 m || 
|-id=469 bgcolor=#fefefe
| 315469 ||  || — || December 14, 2007 || Mount Lemmon || Mount Lemmon Survey || V || align=right data-sort-value="0.72" | 720 m || 
|-id=470 bgcolor=#E9E9E9
| 315470 ||  || — || December 17, 2007 || Mount Lemmon || Mount Lemmon Survey || — || align=right data-sort-value="0.91" | 910 m || 
|-id=471 bgcolor=#fefefe
| 315471 ||  || — || December 16, 2007 || Mount Lemmon || Mount Lemmon Survey || V || align=right data-sort-value="0.98" | 980 m || 
|-id=472 bgcolor=#fefefe
| 315472 ||  || — || December 16, 2007 || Mount Lemmon || Mount Lemmon Survey || — || align=right | 1.0 km || 
|-id=473 bgcolor=#fefefe
| 315473 ||  || — || December 17, 2007 || Mount Lemmon || Mount Lemmon Survey || — || align=right | 1.2 km || 
|-id=474 bgcolor=#fefefe
| 315474 ||  || — || December 16, 2007 || Kitt Peak || Spacewatch || — || align=right data-sort-value="0.79" | 790 m || 
|-id=475 bgcolor=#fefefe
| 315475 ||  || — || December 16, 2007 || Kitt Peak || Spacewatch || MAS || align=right data-sort-value="0.74" | 740 m || 
|-id=476 bgcolor=#fefefe
| 315476 ||  || — || December 16, 2007 || Kitt Peak || Spacewatch || MAS || align=right data-sort-value="0.65" | 650 m || 
|-id=477 bgcolor=#fefefe
| 315477 ||  || — || March 11, 2005 || Kitt Peak || Spacewatch || — || align=right data-sort-value="0.67" | 670 m || 
|-id=478 bgcolor=#fefefe
| 315478 ||  || — || December 28, 2007 || Kitt Peak || Spacewatch || V || align=right data-sort-value="0.65" | 650 m || 
|-id=479 bgcolor=#fefefe
| 315479 ||  || — || December 30, 2007 || Mount Lemmon || Mount Lemmon Survey || NYS || align=right data-sort-value="0.73" | 730 m || 
|-id=480 bgcolor=#E9E9E9
| 315480 ||  || — || December 28, 2007 || Kitt Peak || Spacewatch || — || align=right data-sort-value="0.86" | 860 m || 
|-id=481 bgcolor=#fefefe
| 315481 ||  || — || December 30, 2007 || Kitt Peak || Spacewatch || — || align=right data-sort-value="0.97" | 970 m || 
|-id=482 bgcolor=#E9E9E9
| 315482 ||  || — || December 31, 2007 || Kitt Peak || Spacewatch || — || align=right | 1.2 km || 
|-id=483 bgcolor=#E9E9E9
| 315483 ||  || — || December 31, 2007 || Kitt Peak || Spacewatch || — || align=right | 1.0 km || 
|-id=484 bgcolor=#E9E9E9
| 315484 ||  || — || December 30, 2007 || Mount Lemmon || Mount Lemmon Survey || — || align=right data-sort-value="0.93" | 930 m || 
|-id=485 bgcolor=#fefefe
| 315485 ||  || — || December 17, 2007 || Mount Lemmon || Mount Lemmon Survey || — || align=right | 1.1 km || 
|-id=486 bgcolor=#E9E9E9
| 315486 ||  || — || December 16, 2007 || Socorro || LINEAR || EUN || align=right | 1.7 km || 
|-id=487 bgcolor=#E9E9E9
| 315487 ||  || — || December 18, 2007 || Socorro || LINEAR || — || align=right | 1.2 km || 
|-id=488 bgcolor=#E9E9E9
| 315488 ||  || — || December 18, 2007 || Kitt Peak || Spacewatch || MAR || align=right | 1.1 km || 
|-id=489 bgcolor=#E9E9E9
| 315489 ||  || — || December 18, 2007 || Mount Lemmon || Mount Lemmon Survey || — || align=right | 3.4 km || 
|-id=490 bgcolor=#fefefe
| 315490 ||  || — || January 1, 2008 || Bisei SG Center || BATTeRS || ERI || align=right | 1.5 km || 
|-id=491 bgcolor=#fefefe
| 315491 ||  || — || January 1, 2008 || Kitt Peak || Spacewatch || — || align=right | 1.0 km || 
|-id=492 bgcolor=#E9E9E9
| 315492 ||  || — || January 4, 2008 || Andrushivka || Andrushivka Obs. || — || align=right | 1.4 km || 
|-id=493 bgcolor=#fefefe
| 315493 Zimin ||  ||  || January 6, 2008 || Zelenchukskaya || S. Korotkiy, T. V. Kryachko || V || align=right | 1.1 km || 
|-id=494 bgcolor=#E9E9E9
| 315494 ||  || — || January 7, 2008 || La Sagra || OAM Obs. || HNS || align=right | 1.6 km || 
|-id=495 bgcolor=#fefefe
| 315495 ||  || — || January 10, 2008 || Badlands || F. Tozzi || — || align=right | 1.2 km || 
|-id=496 bgcolor=#E9E9E9
| 315496 ||  || — || January 6, 2008 || La Sagra || OAM Obs. || — || align=right | 1.1 km || 
|-id=497 bgcolor=#E9E9E9
| 315497 ||  || — || January 9, 2008 || Lulin || LUSS || BAR || align=right | 1.6 km || 
|-id=498 bgcolor=#E9E9E9
| 315498 ||  || — || January 10, 2008 || Kitt Peak || Spacewatch || — || align=right | 1.0 km || 
|-id=499 bgcolor=#E9E9E9
| 315499 ||  || — || January 10, 2008 || Kitt Peak || Spacewatch || — || align=right data-sort-value="0.92" | 920 m || 
|-id=500 bgcolor=#E9E9E9
| 315500 ||  || — || October 23, 2006 || Catalina || CSS || EUN || align=right | 1.8 km || 
|}

315501–315600 

|-bgcolor=#E9E9E9
| 315501 ||  || — || January 10, 2008 || Mount Lemmon || Mount Lemmon Survey || — || align=right data-sort-value="0.76" | 760 m || 
|-id=502 bgcolor=#E9E9E9
| 315502 ||  || — || January 10, 2008 || Mount Lemmon || Mount Lemmon Survey || — || align=right | 1.0 km || 
|-id=503 bgcolor=#E9E9E9
| 315503 ||  || — || January 10, 2008 || Mount Lemmon || Mount Lemmon Survey || — || align=right data-sort-value="0.99" | 990 m || 
|-id=504 bgcolor=#E9E9E9
| 315504 ||  || — || January 10, 2008 || Mount Lemmon || Mount Lemmon Survey || — || align=right | 1.6 km || 
|-id=505 bgcolor=#E9E9E9
| 315505 ||  || — || January 10, 2008 || Mount Lemmon || Mount Lemmon Survey || EUN || align=right | 1.5 km || 
|-id=506 bgcolor=#fefefe
| 315506 ||  || — || January 10, 2008 || Goodricke-Pigott || R. A. Tucker || — || align=right | 1.7 km || 
|-id=507 bgcolor=#fefefe
| 315507 ||  || — || January 11, 2008 || Desert Eagle || W. K. Y. Yeung || — || align=right | 1.3 km || 
|-id=508 bgcolor=#FFC2E0
| 315508 ||  || — || January 12, 2008 || Mount Lemmon || Mount Lemmon Survey || AMO || align=right data-sort-value="0.84" | 840 m || 
|-id=509 bgcolor=#fefefe
| 315509 ||  || — || January 10, 2008 || Kitt Peak || Spacewatch || — || align=right data-sort-value="0.93" | 930 m || 
|-id=510 bgcolor=#E9E9E9
| 315510 ||  || — || January 10, 2008 || Kitt Peak || Spacewatch || — || align=right | 1.8 km || 
|-id=511 bgcolor=#fefefe
| 315511 ||  || — || January 11, 2008 || Kitt Peak || Spacewatch || — || align=right data-sort-value="0.79" | 790 m || 
|-id=512 bgcolor=#fefefe
| 315512 ||  || — || January 11, 2008 || Kitt Peak || Spacewatch || V || align=right data-sort-value="0.95" | 950 m || 
|-id=513 bgcolor=#E9E9E9
| 315513 ||  || — || January 11, 2008 || Kitt Peak || Spacewatch || — || align=right data-sort-value="0.94" | 940 m || 
|-id=514 bgcolor=#E9E9E9
| 315514 ||  || — || January 11, 2008 || Kitt Peak || Spacewatch || — || align=right | 1.4 km || 
|-id=515 bgcolor=#fefefe
| 315515 ||  || — || January 11, 2008 || Kitt Peak || Spacewatch || NYS || align=right data-sort-value="0.77" | 770 m || 
|-id=516 bgcolor=#E9E9E9
| 315516 ||  || — || January 11, 2008 || Kitt Peak || Spacewatch || — || align=right | 1.2 km || 
|-id=517 bgcolor=#E9E9E9
| 315517 ||  || — || January 11, 2008 || Mount Lemmon || Mount Lemmon Survey || GER || align=right | 1.4 km || 
|-id=518 bgcolor=#E9E9E9
| 315518 ||  || — || January 11, 2008 || Kitt Peak || Spacewatch || — || align=right data-sort-value="0.91" | 910 m || 
|-id=519 bgcolor=#E9E9E9
| 315519 ||  || — || January 12, 2008 || Kitt Peak || Spacewatch || — || align=right | 1.2 km || 
|-id=520 bgcolor=#E9E9E9
| 315520 ||  || — || January 12, 2008 || Kitt Peak || Spacewatch || — || align=right | 1.2 km || 
|-id=521 bgcolor=#E9E9E9
| 315521 ||  || — || January 10, 2008 || Kitt Peak || Spacewatch || — || align=right | 2.0 km || 
|-id=522 bgcolor=#E9E9E9
| 315522 ||  || — || October 21, 2006 || Kitt Peak || Spacewatch || — || align=right | 1.6 km || 
|-id=523 bgcolor=#fefefe
| 315523 ||  || — || January 13, 2008 || Kitt Peak || Spacewatch || MAS || align=right data-sort-value="0.80" | 800 m || 
|-id=524 bgcolor=#E9E9E9
| 315524 ||  || — || January 14, 2008 || Kitt Peak || Spacewatch || — || align=right | 2.8 km || 
|-id=525 bgcolor=#fefefe
| 315525 ||  || — || January 15, 2008 || Mount Lemmon || Mount Lemmon Survey || NYS || align=right data-sort-value="0.70" | 700 m || 
|-id=526 bgcolor=#E9E9E9
| 315526 ||  || — || January 15, 2008 || Kitt Peak || Spacewatch || — || align=right | 1.4 km || 
|-id=527 bgcolor=#E9E9E9
| 315527 ||  || — || January 1, 2008 || Kitt Peak || Spacewatch || — || align=right | 2.5 km || 
|-id=528 bgcolor=#E9E9E9
| 315528 ||  || — || January 11, 2008 || Mount Lemmon || Mount Lemmon Survey || MAR || align=right | 1.2 km || 
|-id=529 bgcolor=#E9E9E9
| 315529 ||  || — || January 6, 2008 || Mauna Kea || P. A. Wiegert || — || align=right data-sort-value="0.88" | 880 m || 
|-id=530 bgcolor=#C2E0FF
| 315530 ||  || — || January 11, 2008 || Palomar || M. E. Schwamb, M. E. Brown || Haumea || align=right | 437 km || 
|-id=531 bgcolor=#E9E9E9
| 315531 ||  || — || January 11, 2008 || Mount Lemmon || Mount Lemmon Survey || WIT || align=right | 1.3 km || 
|-id=532 bgcolor=#d6d6d6
| 315532 ||  || — || January 10, 2008 || Kitt Peak || Spacewatch || — || align=right | 2.7 km || 
|-id=533 bgcolor=#E9E9E9
| 315533 ||  || — || January 11, 2008 || Socorro || LINEAR || MAR || align=right | 1.8 km || 
|-id=534 bgcolor=#fefefe
| 315534 ||  || — || January 16, 2008 || Kitt Peak || Spacewatch || — || align=right | 1.1 km || 
|-id=535 bgcolor=#E9E9E9
| 315535 ||  || — || January 16, 2008 || Kitt Peak || Spacewatch || — || align=right | 1.3 km || 
|-id=536 bgcolor=#E9E9E9
| 315536 ||  || — || December 18, 2007 || Mount Lemmon || Mount Lemmon Survey || — || align=right | 1.2 km || 
|-id=537 bgcolor=#fefefe
| 315537 ||  || — || January 28, 2008 || Lulin || LUSS || — || align=right | 1.2 km || 
|-id=538 bgcolor=#E9E9E9
| 315538 ||  || — || January 27, 2008 || Marly || P. Kocher || — || align=right data-sort-value="0.90" | 900 m || 
|-id=539 bgcolor=#E9E9E9
| 315539 ||  || — || January 31, 2008 || Mount Lemmon || Mount Lemmon Survey || — || align=right data-sort-value="0.87" | 870 m || 
|-id=540 bgcolor=#E9E9E9
| 315540 ||  || — || January 30, 2008 || Mount Lemmon || Mount Lemmon Survey || ADE || align=right | 1.9 km || 
|-id=541 bgcolor=#E9E9E9
| 315541 ||  || — || January 31, 2008 || Mount Lemmon || Mount Lemmon Survey || — || align=right | 1.7 km || 
|-id=542 bgcolor=#E9E9E9
| 315542 ||  || — || January 31, 2008 || Mount Lemmon || Mount Lemmon Survey || AER || align=right | 1.4 km || 
|-id=543 bgcolor=#E9E9E9
| 315543 ||  || — || January 31, 2008 || Catalina || CSS || ADE || align=right | 2.2 km || 
|-id=544 bgcolor=#E9E9E9
| 315544 ||  || — || January 30, 2008 || Catalina || CSS || — || align=right | 1.1 km || 
|-id=545 bgcolor=#E9E9E9
| 315545 ||  || — || January 30, 2008 || Kitt Peak || Spacewatch || — || align=right | 2.0 km || 
|-id=546 bgcolor=#E9E9E9
| 315546 ||  || — || January 31, 2008 || Mount Lemmon || Mount Lemmon Survey || EUN || align=right | 1.7 km || 
|-id=547 bgcolor=#E9E9E9
| 315547 ||  || — || January 30, 2008 || Catalina || CSS || — || align=right | 2.3 km || 
|-id=548 bgcolor=#E9E9E9
| 315548 ||  || — || January 19, 2008 || Mount Lemmon || Mount Lemmon Survey || — || align=right | 1.4 km || 
|-id=549 bgcolor=#E9E9E9
| 315549 ||  || — || January 18, 2008 || Kitt Peak || Spacewatch || — || align=right data-sort-value="0.87" | 870 m || 
|-id=550 bgcolor=#E9E9E9
| 315550 ||  || — || February 11, 2004 || Kitt Peak || Spacewatch || — || align=right | 1.2 km || 
|-id=551 bgcolor=#fefefe
| 315551 ||  || — || January 10, 2008 || Kitt Peak || Spacewatch || FLO || align=right data-sort-value="0.84" | 840 m || 
|-id=552 bgcolor=#E9E9E9
| 315552 ||  || — || February 5, 2008 || La Sagra || OAM Obs. || — || align=right | 1.8 km || 
|-id=553 bgcolor=#E9E9E9
| 315553 ||  || — || September 25, 2006 || Kitt Peak || Spacewatch || — || align=right data-sort-value="0.89" | 890 m || 
|-id=554 bgcolor=#E9E9E9
| 315554 ||  || — || February 3, 2008 || Kitt Peak || Spacewatch || — || align=right | 1.9 km || 
|-id=555 bgcolor=#E9E9E9
| 315555 ||  || — || February 3, 2008 || Kitt Peak || Spacewatch || — || align=right | 1.7 km || 
|-id=556 bgcolor=#E9E9E9
| 315556 ||  || — || February 6, 2008 || Catalina || CSS || — || align=right | 1.7 km || 
|-id=557 bgcolor=#E9E9E9
| 315557 ||  || — || February 7, 2008 || La Sagra || OAM Obs. || — || align=right | 1.3 km || 
|-id=558 bgcolor=#E9E9E9
| 315558 ||  || — || February 1, 2008 || Kitt Peak || Spacewatch || — || align=right data-sort-value="0.78" | 780 m || 
|-id=559 bgcolor=#E9E9E9
| 315559 ||  || — || February 2, 2008 || Kitt Peak || Spacewatch || — || align=right | 1.3 km || 
|-id=560 bgcolor=#E9E9E9
| 315560 ||  || — || February 2, 2008 || Kitt Peak || Spacewatch || — || align=right | 1.2 km || 
|-id=561 bgcolor=#E9E9E9
| 315561 ||  || — || February 2, 2008 || Kitt Peak || Spacewatch || — || align=right data-sort-value="0.82" | 820 m || 
|-id=562 bgcolor=#E9E9E9
| 315562 ||  || — || February 2, 2008 || Kitt Peak || Spacewatch || — || align=right | 1.1 km || 
|-id=563 bgcolor=#E9E9E9
| 315563 ||  || — || February 2, 2008 || Mount Lemmon || Mount Lemmon Survey || — || align=right data-sort-value="0.97" | 970 m || 
|-id=564 bgcolor=#E9E9E9
| 315564 ||  || — || February 2, 2008 || Mount Lemmon || Mount Lemmon Survey || — || align=right | 1.2 km || 
|-id=565 bgcolor=#E9E9E9
| 315565 ||  || — || February 2, 2008 || Kitt Peak || Spacewatch || — || align=right data-sort-value="0.90" | 900 m || 
|-id=566 bgcolor=#E9E9E9
| 315566 ||  || — || February 2, 2008 || Kitt Peak || Spacewatch || — || align=right | 1.7 km || 
|-id=567 bgcolor=#E9E9E9
| 315567 ||  || — || February 2, 2008 || Kitt Peak || Spacewatch || — || align=right | 3.1 km || 
|-id=568 bgcolor=#E9E9E9
| 315568 ||  || — || February 2, 2008 || Kitt Peak || Spacewatch || WIT || align=right | 1.2 km || 
|-id=569 bgcolor=#E9E9E9
| 315569 ||  || — || February 3, 2008 || Catalina || CSS || — || align=right | 1.5 km || 
|-id=570 bgcolor=#E9E9E9
| 315570 ||  || — || February 6, 2008 || Catalina || CSS || — || align=right | 3.4 km || 
|-id=571 bgcolor=#E9E9E9
| 315571 ||  || — || February 7, 2008 || Catalina || CSS || — || align=right | 2.1 km || 
|-id=572 bgcolor=#E9E9E9
| 315572 ||  || — || February 7, 2008 || Kitt Peak || Spacewatch || — || align=right | 1.1 km || 
|-id=573 bgcolor=#E9E9E9
| 315573 ||  || — || February 7, 2008 || Mount Lemmon || Mount Lemmon Survey || — || align=right | 1.4 km || 
|-id=574 bgcolor=#E9E9E9
| 315574 ||  || — || February 7, 2008 || Mount Lemmon || Mount Lemmon Survey || — || align=right | 1.1 km || 
|-id=575 bgcolor=#E9E9E9
| 315575 ||  || — || February 7, 2008 || Mount Lemmon || Mount Lemmon Survey || — || align=right | 2.5 km || 
|-id=576 bgcolor=#E9E9E9
| 315576 ||  || — || February 8, 2008 || Catalina || CSS || — || align=right | 3.4 km || 
|-id=577 bgcolor=#E9E9E9
| 315577 Carmenchu ||  ||  || February 9, 2008 || La Cañada || J. Lacruz || — || align=right | 1.2 km || 
|-id=578 bgcolor=#E9E9E9
| 315578 ||  || — || February 6, 2008 || Catalina || CSS || — || align=right | 1.4 km || 
|-id=579 bgcolor=#E9E9E9
| 315579 Vandersyppe ||  ||  || February 10, 2008 || Uccle || P. De Cat || — || align=right | 1.0 km || 
|-id=580 bgcolor=#E9E9E9
| 315580 ||  || — || February 9, 2008 || Mount Lemmon || Mount Lemmon Survey || — || align=right | 1.1 km || 
|-id=581 bgcolor=#E9E9E9
| 315581 ||  || — || February 6, 2008 || Catalina || CSS || — || align=right | 1.1 km || 
|-id=582 bgcolor=#E9E9E9
| 315582 ||  || — || February 6, 2008 || Catalina || CSS || — || align=right | 1.9 km || 
|-id=583 bgcolor=#E9E9E9
| 315583 ||  || — || February 7, 2008 || Mount Lemmon || Mount Lemmon Survey || — || align=right data-sort-value="0.94" | 940 m || 
|-id=584 bgcolor=#E9E9E9
| 315584 ||  || — || February 7, 2008 || Mount Lemmon || Mount Lemmon Survey || — || align=right | 2.3 km || 
|-id=585 bgcolor=#E9E9E9
| 315585 ||  || — || February 7, 2008 || Mount Lemmon || Mount Lemmon Survey || — || align=right | 1.3 km || 
|-id=586 bgcolor=#E9E9E9
| 315586 ||  || — || February 7, 2008 || Mount Lemmon || Mount Lemmon Survey || — || align=right | 2.4 km || 
|-id=587 bgcolor=#E9E9E9
| 315587 ||  || — || February 8, 2008 || Catalina || CSS || — || align=right | 1.8 km || 
|-id=588 bgcolor=#E9E9E9
| 315588 ||  || — || February 9, 2008 || Kitt Peak || Spacewatch || — || align=right data-sort-value="0.90" | 900 m || 
|-id=589 bgcolor=#E9E9E9
| 315589 ||  || — || February 12, 2008 || Mayhill || A. Lowe || — || align=right | 1.5 km || 
|-id=590 bgcolor=#E9E9E9
| 315590 ||  || — || February 12, 2008 || Wildberg || R. Apitzsch || — || align=right | 1.4 km || 
|-id=591 bgcolor=#E9E9E9
| 315591 ||  || — || February 13, 2008 || Schiaparelli || Schiaparelli Obs. || — || align=right | 2.8 km || 
|-id=592 bgcolor=#E9E9E9
| 315592 ||  || — || February 7, 2008 || Kitt Peak || Spacewatch || — || align=right | 1.4 km || 
|-id=593 bgcolor=#E9E9E9
| 315593 ||  || — || February 8, 2008 || Kitt Peak || Spacewatch || ADE || align=right | 2.3 km || 
|-id=594 bgcolor=#d6d6d6
| 315594 ||  || — || February 8, 2008 || Kitt Peak || Spacewatch || — || align=right | 4.7 km || 
|-id=595 bgcolor=#E9E9E9
| 315595 ||  || — || February 8, 2008 || Kitt Peak || Spacewatch || — || align=right | 1.0 km || 
|-id=596 bgcolor=#E9E9E9
| 315596 ||  || — || February 8, 2008 || Kitt Peak || Spacewatch || — || align=right | 1.9 km || 
|-id=597 bgcolor=#E9E9E9
| 315597 ||  || — || February 8, 2008 || Kitt Peak || Spacewatch || — || align=right | 1.2 km || 
|-id=598 bgcolor=#E9E9E9
| 315598 ||  || — || February 9, 2008 || Kitt Peak || Spacewatch || — || align=right | 1.8 km || 
|-id=599 bgcolor=#E9E9E9
| 315599 ||  || — || March 31, 2004 || Kitt Peak || Spacewatch || — || align=right | 1.1 km || 
|-id=600 bgcolor=#E9E9E9
| 315600 ||  || — || February 9, 2008 || Kitt Peak || Spacewatch || WIT || align=right data-sort-value="0.96" | 960 m || 
|}

315601–315700 

|-bgcolor=#E9E9E9
| 315601 ||  || — || February 9, 2008 || Catalina || CSS || — || align=right | 1.7 km || 
|-id=602 bgcolor=#E9E9E9
| 315602 ||  || — || February 9, 2008 || Kitt Peak || Spacewatch || — || align=right | 2.6 km || 
|-id=603 bgcolor=#E9E9E9
| 315603 ||  || — || February 10, 2008 || Catalina || CSS || HNS || align=right | 1.5 km || 
|-id=604 bgcolor=#E9E9E9
| 315604 ||  || — || February 11, 2008 || Kitt Peak || Spacewatch || — || align=right | 4.2 km || 
|-id=605 bgcolor=#E9E9E9
| 315605 ||  || — || February 6, 2008 || Socorro || LINEAR || JUN || align=right | 3.7 km || 
|-id=606 bgcolor=#E9E9E9
| 315606 ||  || — || January 18, 2008 || Mount Lemmon || Mount Lemmon Survey || HNS || align=right | 1.3 km || 
|-id=607 bgcolor=#E9E9E9
| 315607 ||  || — || February 6, 2008 || Catalina || CSS || — || align=right | 3.8 km || 
|-id=608 bgcolor=#E9E9E9
| 315608 ||  || — || February 8, 2008 || Catalina || CSS || — || align=right | 1.8 km || 
|-id=609 bgcolor=#E9E9E9
| 315609 ||  || — || February 9, 2008 || Catalina || CSS || — || align=right | 1.3 km || 
|-id=610 bgcolor=#E9E9E9
| 315610 ||  || — || February 9, 2008 || Catalina || CSS || — || align=right | 1.5 km || 
|-id=611 bgcolor=#fefefe
| 315611 ||  || — || February 9, 2008 || Catalina || CSS || — || align=right | 1.3 km || 
|-id=612 bgcolor=#E9E9E9
| 315612 ||  || — || February 11, 2008 || Mount Lemmon || Mount Lemmon Survey || EUN || align=right | 1.8 km || 
|-id=613 bgcolor=#E9E9E9
| 315613 ||  || — || February 11, 2008 || Mount Lemmon || Mount Lemmon Survey || NEM || align=right | 2.7 km || 
|-id=614 bgcolor=#E9E9E9
| 315614 ||  || — || February 11, 2008 || Mount Lemmon || Mount Lemmon Survey || GEF || align=right | 1.6 km || 
|-id=615 bgcolor=#E9E9E9
| 315615 ||  || — || February 2, 2008 || Kitt Peak || Spacewatch || — || align=right data-sort-value="0.75" | 750 m || 
|-id=616 bgcolor=#E9E9E9
| 315616 ||  || — || February 3, 2008 || Kitt Peak || Spacewatch || — || align=right | 1.7 km || 
|-id=617 bgcolor=#d6d6d6
| 315617 ||  || — || February 13, 2008 || Mount Lemmon || Mount Lemmon Survey || EOS || align=right | 2.4 km || 
|-id=618 bgcolor=#E9E9E9
| 315618 ||  || — || February 13, 2008 || Kitt Peak || Spacewatch || — || align=right | 1.4 km || 
|-id=619 bgcolor=#E9E9E9
| 315619 ||  || — || February 13, 2008 || Kitt Peak || Spacewatch || — || align=right | 1.3 km || 
|-id=620 bgcolor=#E9E9E9
| 315620 ||  || — || February 13, 2008 || Mount Lemmon || Mount Lemmon Survey || — || align=right | 1.4 km || 
|-id=621 bgcolor=#E9E9E9
| 315621 ||  || — || February 13, 2008 || Mount Lemmon || Mount Lemmon Survey || — || align=right | 2.4 km || 
|-id=622 bgcolor=#E9E9E9
| 315622 ||  || — || February 13, 2008 || Mount Lemmon || Mount Lemmon Survey || WIT || align=right | 1.2 km || 
|-id=623 bgcolor=#E9E9E9
| 315623 ||  || — || February 11, 2008 || Mount Lemmon || Mount Lemmon Survey || WIT || align=right | 1.1 km || 
|-id=624 bgcolor=#E9E9E9
| 315624 ||  || — || February 10, 2008 || Kitt Peak || Spacewatch || — || align=right | 2.5 km || 
|-id=625 bgcolor=#E9E9E9
| 315625 ||  || — || February 2, 2008 || Kitt Peak || Spacewatch || — || align=right | 1.9 km || 
|-id=626 bgcolor=#E9E9E9
| 315626 ||  || — || February 3, 2008 || Kitt Peak || Spacewatch || — || align=right data-sort-value="0.88" | 880 m || 
|-id=627 bgcolor=#E9E9E9
| 315627 ||  || — || February 7, 2008 || Mount Lemmon || Mount Lemmon Survey || — || align=right | 1.0 km || 
|-id=628 bgcolor=#E9E9E9
| 315628 ||  || — || August 29, 2006 || Kitt Peak || Spacewatch || — || align=right | 1.1 km || 
|-id=629 bgcolor=#E9E9E9
| 315629 ||  || — || February 9, 2008 || Socorro || LINEAR || — || align=right | 2.0 km || 
|-id=630 bgcolor=#E9E9E9
| 315630 ||  || — || February 13, 2008 || Mount Lemmon || Mount Lemmon Survey || — || align=right | 2.9 km || 
|-id=631 bgcolor=#E9E9E9
| 315631 ||  || — || February 24, 2008 || Kitt Peak || Spacewatch || — || align=right data-sort-value="0.94" | 940 m || 
|-id=632 bgcolor=#E9E9E9
| 315632 ||  || — || February 26, 2008 || Mount Lemmon || Mount Lemmon Survey || ADE || align=right | 2.6 km || 
|-id=633 bgcolor=#E9E9E9
| 315633 ||  || — || February 26, 2008 || Mount Lemmon || Mount Lemmon Survey || — || align=right | 1.2 km || 
|-id=634 bgcolor=#E9E9E9
| 315634 ||  || — || February 26, 2008 || Mount Lemmon || Mount Lemmon Survey || — || align=right data-sort-value="0.99" | 990 m || 
|-id=635 bgcolor=#E9E9E9
| 315635 ||  || — || February 28, 2008 || Mount Lemmon || Mount Lemmon Survey || — || align=right data-sort-value="0.81" | 810 m || 
|-id=636 bgcolor=#E9E9E9
| 315636 ||  || — || February 29, 2008 || Purple Mountain || PMO NEO || — || align=right | 2.9 km || 
|-id=637 bgcolor=#E9E9E9
| 315637 ||  || — || February 26, 2008 || Mount Lemmon || Mount Lemmon Survey || — || align=right | 1.6 km || 
|-id=638 bgcolor=#E9E9E9
| 315638 ||  || — || February 24, 2008 || Kitt Peak || Spacewatch || MIS || align=right | 2.5 km || 
|-id=639 bgcolor=#E9E9E9
| 315639 ||  || — || February 26, 2008 || Mount Lemmon || Mount Lemmon Survey || — || align=right | 1.4 km || 
|-id=640 bgcolor=#E9E9E9
| 315640 ||  || — || February 27, 2008 || Kitt Peak || Spacewatch || ADE || align=right | 2.1 km || 
|-id=641 bgcolor=#E9E9E9
| 315641 ||  || — || February 27, 2008 || Kitt Peak || Spacewatch || — || align=right | 1.1 km || 
|-id=642 bgcolor=#E9E9E9
| 315642 ||  || — || February 27, 2008 || Catalina || CSS || — || align=right | 3.5 km || 
|-id=643 bgcolor=#E9E9E9
| 315643 ||  || — || February 27, 2008 || Kitt Peak || Spacewatch || JUN || align=right | 1.2 km || 
|-id=644 bgcolor=#d6d6d6
| 315644 ||  || — || February 27, 2008 || Kitt Peak || Spacewatch || — || align=right | 4.2 km || 
|-id=645 bgcolor=#E9E9E9
| 315645 ||  || — || February 27, 2008 || Mount Lemmon || Mount Lemmon Survey || — || align=right | 2.2 km || 
|-id=646 bgcolor=#E9E9E9
| 315646 ||  || — || February 10, 2008 || Mount Lemmon || Mount Lemmon Survey || WIT || align=right | 1.1 km || 
|-id=647 bgcolor=#E9E9E9
| 315647 ||  || — || February 27, 2008 || Mount Lemmon || Mount Lemmon Survey || — || align=right | 2.2 km || 
|-id=648 bgcolor=#E9E9E9
| 315648 ||  || — || February 27, 2008 || Kitt Peak || Spacewatch || — || align=right | 2.0 km || 
|-id=649 bgcolor=#E9E9E9
| 315649 ||  || — || February 28, 2008 || Kitt Peak || Spacewatch || — || align=right | 1.5 km || 
|-id=650 bgcolor=#E9E9E9
| 315650 ||  || — || February 10, 2008 || Mount Lemmon || Mount Lemmon Survey || MRX || align=right | 1.3 km || 
|-id=651 bgcolor=#E9E9E9
| 315651 ||  || — || February 28, 2008 || Mount Lemmon || Mount Lemmon Survey || — || align=right data-sort-value="0.89" | 890 m || 
|-id=652 bgcolor=#E9E9E9
| 315652 ||  || — || February 28, 2008 || Kitt Peak || Spacewatch || — || align=right | 1.0 km || 
|-id=653 bgcolor=#E9E9E9
| 315653 ||  || — || February 28, 2008 || Mount Lemmon || Mount Lemmon Survey || NEM || align=right | 2.8 km || 
|-id=654 bgcolor=#E9E9E9
| 315654 ||  || — || February 13, 2008 || Mount Lemmon || Mount Lemmon Survey || — || align=right | 2.1 km || 
|-id=655 bgcolor=#E9E9E9
| 315655 ||  || — || April 25, 2004 || Apache Point || SDSS || HNS || align=right | 1.2 km || 
|-id=656 bgcolor=#E9E9E9
| 315656 ||  || — || February 29, 2008 || Mount Lemmon || Mount Lemmon Survey || — || align=right | 1.9 km || 
|-id=657 bgcolor=#E9E9E9
| 315657 ||  || — || February 27, 2008 || Kitt Peak || Spacewatch || — || align=right | 1.8 km || 
|-id=658 bgcolor=#E9E9E9
| 315658 ||  || — || February 29, 2008 || Catalina || CSS || EUN || align=right | 1.7 km || 
|-id=659 bgcolor=#E9E9E9
| 315659 ||  || — || February 28, 2008 || Catalina || CSS || JUN || align=right | 1.3 km || 
|-id=660 bgcolor=#E9E9E9
| 315660 ||  || — || February 29, 2008 || Catalina || CSS || — || align=right | 2.5 km || 
|-id=661 bgcolor=#fefefe
| 315661 ||  || — || February 28, 2008 || Kitt Peak || Spacewatch || — || align=right | 1.3 km || 
|-id=662 bgcolor=#E9E9E9
| 315662 ||  || — || February 28, 2008 || Mount Lemmon || Mount Lemmon Survey || — || align=right | 2.4 km || 
|-id=663 bgcolor=#E9E9E9
| 315663 ||  || — || February 28, 2008 || Mount Lemmon || Mount Lemmon Survey || MIS || align=right | 2.9 km || 
|-id=664 bgcolor=#E9E9E9
| 315664 ||  || — || February 28, 2008 || Mount Lemmon || Mount Lemmon Survey || — || align=right | 1.0 km || 
|-id=665 bgcolor=#E9E9E9
| 315665 ||  || — || February 28, 2008 || Mount Lemmon || Mount Lemmon Survey || — || align=right | 1.6 km || 
|-id=666 bgcolor=#E9E9E9
| 315666 ||  || — || February 3, 2008 || Kitt Peak || Spacewatch || — || align=right | 1.7 km || 
|-id=667 bgcolor=#d6d6d6
| 315667 ||  || — || February 27, 2008 || Mount Lemmon || Mount Lemmon Survey || — || align=right | 2.8 km || 
|-id=668 bgcolor=#d6d6d6
| 315668 ||  || — || February 28, 2008 || Kitt Peak || Spacewatch || KOR || align=right | 1.8 km || 
|-id=669 bgcolor=#E9E9E9
| 315669 ||  || — || February 27, 2008 || Catalina || CSS || — || align=right | 1.1 km || 
|-id=670 bgcolor=#E9E9E9
| 315670 ||  || — || February 29, 2008 || Catalina || CSS || — || align=right | 1.7 km || 
|-id=671 bgcolor=#E9E9E9
| 315671 ||  || — || February 28, 2008 || Kitt Peak || Spacewatch || — || align=right | 2.2 km || 
|-id=672 bgcolor=#d6d6d6
| 315672 ||  || — || October 21, 2000 || Kitt Peak || Spacewatch || EOS || align=right | 2.5 km || 
|-id=673 bgcolor=#E9E9E9
| 315673 ||  || — || March 2, 2008 || Mount Lemmon || Mount Lemmon Survey || — || align=right | 1.5 km || 
|-id=674 bgcolor=#E9E9E9
| 315674 ||  || — || March 3, 2008 || Grove Creek || F. Tozzi || — || align=right | 1.8 km || 
|-id=675 bgcolor=#E9E9E9
| 315675 ||  || — || March 5, 2008 || Jarnac || Jarnac Obs. || — || align=right | 2.3 km || 
|-id=676 bgcolor=#E9E9E9
| 315676 ||  || — || March 6, 2008 || La Sagra || OAM Obs. || HNS || align=right | 1.6 km || 
|-id=677 bgcolor=#E9E9E9
| 315677 ||  || — || March 1, 2008 || Kitt Peak || Spacewatch || — || align=right | 3.0 km || 
|-id=678 bgcolor=#E9E9E9
| 315678 ||  || — || March 1, 2008 || Kitt Peak || Spacewatch || — || align=right | 1.1 km || 
|-id=679 bgcolor=#E9E9E9
| 315679 ||  || — || March 1, 2008 || Kitt Peak || Spacewatch || — || align=right | 1.8 km || 
|-id=680 bgcolor=#E9E9E9
| 315680 ||  || — || March 1, 2008 || Kitt Peak || Spacewatch || — || align=right | 2.0 km || 
|-id=681 bgcolor=#E9E9E9
| 315681 ||  || — || March 2, 2008 || Catalina || CSS || RAF || align=right | 1.1 km || 
|-id=682 bgcolor=#E9E9E9
| 315682 ||  || — || March 3, 2008 || Catalina || CSS || — || align=right | 3.4 km || 
|-id=683 bgcolor=#E9E9E9
| 315683 ||  || — || March 4, 2008 || Catalina || CSS || EUN || align=right | 1.9 km || 
|-id=684 bgcolor=#E9E9E9
| 315684 ||  || — || March 4, 2008 || Mount Lemmon || Mount Lemmon Survey || — || align=right | 2.6 km || 
|-id=685 bgcolor=#E9E9E9
| 315685 ||  || — || March 4, 2008 || Mount Lemmon || Mount Lemmon Survey || DOR || align=right | 2.9 km || 
|-id=686 bgcolor=#E9E9E9
| 315686 ||  || — || March 1, 2008 || Catalina || CSS || — || align=right | 2.7 km || 
|-id=687 bgcolor=#E9E9E9
| 315687 ||  || — || March 2, 2008 || Catalina || CSS || — || align=right | 2.1 km || 
|-id=688 bgcolor=#E9E9E9
| 315688 ||  || — || March 3, 2008 || Kitt Peak || Spacewatch || — || align=right | 3.0 km || 
|-id=689 bgcolor=#E9E9E9
| 315689 ||  || — || March 4, 2008 || Kitt Peak || Spacewatch || — || align=right | 1.2 km || 
|-id=690 bgcolor=#E9E9E9
| 315690 ||  || — || March 4, 2008 || Mount Lemmon || Mount Lemmon Survey || — || align=right | 3.0 km || 
|-id=691 bgcolor=#E9E9E9
| 315691 ||  || — || March 4, 2008 || Mount Lemmon || Mount Lemmon Survey || — || align=right | 2.9 km || 
|-id=692 bgcolor=#E9E9E9
| 315692 ||  || — || March 5, 2008 || Mount Lemmon || Mount Lemmon Survey || WIT || align=right | 1.2 km || 
|-id=693 bgcolor=#E9E9E9
| 315693 ||  || — || March 6, 2008 || Mount Lemmon || Mount Lemmon Survey || — || align=right | 2.2 km || 
|-id=694 bgcolor=#E9E9E9
| 315694 ||  || — || March 6, 2008 || Kitt Peak || Spacewatch || — || align=right | 2.1 km || 
|-id=695 bgcolor=#E9E9E9
| 315695 ||  || — || March 6, 2008 || Mount Lemmon || Mount Lemmon Survey || — || align=right | 2.1 km || 
|-id=696 bgcolor=#E9E9E9
| 315696 ||  || — || March 7, 2008 || Catalina || CSS || RAF || align=right | 1.3 km || 
|-id=697 bgcolor=#E9E9E9
| 315697 ||  || — || March 8, 2008 || Mount Lemmon || Mount Lemmon Survey || — || align=right | 2.6 km || 
|-id=698 bgcolor=#E9E9E9
| 315698 ||  || — || March 7, 2008 || Catalina || CSS || — || align=right | 1.9 km || 
|-id=699 bgcolor=#E9E9E9
| 315699 ||  || — || March 7, 2008 || Kitt Peak || Spacewatch || AGN || align=right | 1.7 km || 
|-id=700 bgcolor=#E9E9E9
| 315700 ||  || — || March 4, 2008 || Socorro || LINEAR || — || align=right | 1.0 km || 
|}

315701–315800 

|-bgcolor=#E9E9E9
| 315701 ||  || — || March 8, 2008 || Socorro || LINEAR || — || align=right | 3.2 km || 
|-id=702 bgcolor=#fefefe
| 315702 ||  || — || March 8, 2008 || Catalina || CSS || — || align=right | 1.1 km || 
|-id=703 bgcolor=#E9E9E9
| 315703 ||  || — || March 7, 2008 || Mount Lemmon || Mount Lemmon Survey || HEN || align=right data-sort-value="0.90" | 900 m || 
|-id=704 bgcolor=#E9E9E9
| 315704 ||  || — || March 7, 2008 || Catalina || CSS || — || align=right | 1.2 km || 
|-id=705 bgcolor=#E9E9E9
| 315705 ||  || — || March 11, 2008 || Socorro || LINEAR || — || align=right | 3.6 km || 
|-id=706 bgcolor=#E9E9E9
| 315706 ||  || — || March 11, 2008 || Kitt Peak || Spacewatch || — || align=right | 3.2 km || 
|-id=707 bgcolor=#E9E9E9
| 315707 ||  || — || March 5, 2008 || Mount Lemmon || Mount Lemmon Survey || — || align=right | 2.3 km || 
|-id=708 bgcolor=#E9E9E9
| 315708 ||  || — || March 5, 2008 || Mount Lemmon || Mount Lemmon Survey || — || align=right | 3.1 km || 
|-id=709 bgcolor=#E9E9E9
| 315709 ||  || — || March 3, 2008 || Catalina || CSS || — || align=right | 3.0 km || 
|-id=710 bgcolor=#E9E9E9
| 315710 ||  || — || March 4, 2008 || Catalina || CSS || — || align=right | 1.3 km || 
|-id=711 bgcolor=#E9E9E9
| 315711 ||  || — || March 6, 2008 || Mount Lemmon || Mount Lemmon Survey || — || align=right | 2.0 km || 
|-id=712 bgcolor=#d6d6d6
| 315712 ||  || — || March 7, 2008 || Catalina || CSS || HYG || align=right | 3.6 km || 
|-id=713 bgcolor=#E9E9E9
| 315713 ||  || — || March 8, 2008 || Kitt Peak || Spacewatch || — || align=right | 2.8 km || 
|-id=714 bgcolor=#E9E9E9
| 315714 ||  || — || March 8, 2008 || Kitt Peak || Spacewatch || — || align=right | 2.5 km || 
|-id=715 bgcolor=#E9E9E9
| 315715 ||  || — || March 8, 2008 || Kitt Peak || Spacewatch || — || align=right | 1.7 km || 
|-id=716 bgcolor=#E9E9E9
| 315716 ||  || — || March 8, 2008 || Catalina || CSS || — || align=right | 2.1 km || 
|-id=717 bgcolor=#d6d6d6
| 315717 ||  || — || March 8, 2008 || Mount Lemmon || Mount Lemmon Survey || KOR || align=right | 1.5 km || 
|-id=718 bgcolor=#E9E9E9
| 315718 ||  || — || March 8, 2008 || Kitt Peak || Spacewatch || VIB || align=right | 2.0 km || 
|-id=719 bgcolor=#E9E9E9
| 315719 ||  || — || March 9, 2008 || Kitt Peak || Spacewatch || MRX || align=right | 1.1 km || 
|-id=720 bgcolor=#E9E9E9
| 315720 ||  || — || March 9, 2008 || Kitt Peak || Spacewatch || — || align=right | 3.2 km || 
|-id=721 bgcolor=#E9E9E9
| 315721 ||  || — || March 9, 2008 || Kitt Peak || Spacewatch || AGN || align=right | 1.1 km || 
|-id=722 bgcolor=#E9E9E9
| 315722 ||  || — || March 10, 2008 || Kitt Peak || Spacewatch || — || align=right | 2.2 km || 
|-id=723 bgcolor=#E9E9E9
| 315723 ||  || — || March 11, 2008 || Kitt Peak || Spacewatch || AEO || align=right | 1.2 km || 
|-id=724 bgcolor=#E9E9E9
| 315724 ||  || — || March 11, 2008 || Kitt Peak || Spacewatch || — || align=right | 2.2 km || 
|-id=725 bgcolor=#E9E9E9
| 315725 ||  || — || March 11, 2008 || Kitt Peak || Spacewatch || — || align=right | 1.6 km || 
|-id=726 bgcolor=#E9E9E9
| 315726 ||  || — || March 11, 2008 || Kitt Peak || Spacewatch || — || align=right | 1.3 km || 
|-id=727 bgcolor=#E9E9E9
| 315727 ||  || — || March 11, 2008 || Kitt Peak || Spacewatch || — || align=right | 1.2 km || 
|-id=728 bgcolor=#E9E9E9
| 315728 ||  || — || March 11, 2008 || Catalina || CSS || — || align=right | 1.6 km || 
|-id=729 bgcolor=#E9E9E9
| 315729 ||  || — || March 12, 2008 || Mount Lemmon || Mount Lemmon Survey || BRG || align=right | 1.4 km || 
|-id=730 bgcolor=#E9E9E9
| 315730 ||  || — || March 13, 2008 || Catalina || CSS || — || align=right | 1.8 km || 
|-id=731 bgcolor=#E9E9E9
| 315731 ||  || — || March 2, 2008 || Kitt Peak || Spacewatch || — || align=right | 2.4 km || 
|-id=732 bgcolor=#d6d6d6
| 315732 ||  || — || March 9, 2008 || Kitt Peak || Spacewatch || — || align=right | 2.2 km || 
|-id=733 bgcolor=#E9E9E9
| 315733 ||  || — || March 4, 2008 || Mount Lemmon || Mount Lemmon Survey || EUN || align=right | 1.5 km || 
|-id=734 bgcolor=#E9E9E9
| 315734 ||  || — || March 11, 2008 || Mount Lemmon || Mount Lemmon Survey || HOF || align=right | 2.6 km || 
|-id=735 bgcolor=#E9E9E9
| 315735 ||  || — || March 1, 2008 || Kitt Peak || Spacewatch || — || align=right | 1.6 km || 
|-id=736 bgcolor=#E9E9E9
| 315736 ||  || — || March 1, 2008 || Kitt Peak || Spacewatch || — || align=right | 2.5 km || 
|-id=737 bgcolor=#E9E9E9
| 315737 ||  || — || March 2, 2008 || Mount Lemmon || Mount Lemmon Survey || HNS || align=right | 1.6 km || 
|-id=738 bgcolor=#E9E9E9
| 315738 ||  || — || March 8, 2008 || Kitt Peak || Spacewatch || AGN || align=right | 1.5 km || 
|-id=739 bgcolor=#d6d6d6
| 315739 ||  || — || October 8, 2005 || Catalina || CSS || — || align=right | 4.3 km || 
|-id=740 bgcolor=#E9E9E9
| 315740 ||  || — || March 25, 2008 || Kitt Peak || Spacewatch || — || align=right | 2.6 km || 
|-id=741 bgcolor=#E9E9E9
| 315741 ||  || — || October 13, 2001 || Kitt Peak || Spacewatch || AST || align=right | 2.1 km || 
|-id=742 bgcolor=#E9E9E9
| 315742 ||  || — || March 25, 2008 || Kitt Peak || Spacewatch || — || align=right | 2.2 km || 
|-id=743 bgcolor=#E9E9E9
| 315743 ||  || — || March 26, 2008 || Mount Lemmon || Mount Lemmon Survey || — || align=right | 2.0 km || 
|-id=744 bgcolor=#E9E9E9
| 315744 ||  || — || March 30, 2008 || Piszkéstető || K. Sárneczky || NEM || align=right | 2.5 km || 
|-id=745 bgcolor=#E9E9E9
| 315745 ||  || — || March 26, 2008 || Kitt Peak || Spacewatch || HOF || align=right | 2.6 km || 
|-id=746 bgcolor=#E9E9E9
| 315746 ||  || — || March 26, 2008 || Kitt Peak || Spacewatch || — || align=right | 1.9 km || 
|-id=747 bgcolor=#E9E9E9
| 315747 ||  || — || March 26, 2008 || Mount Lemmon || Mount Lemmon Survey || — || align=right | 1.5 km || 
|-id=748 bgcolor=#E9E9E9
| 315748 ||  || — || March 26, 2008 || Mount Lemmon || Mount Lemmon Survey || WIT || align=right | 1.2 km || 
|-id=749 bgcolor=#d6d6d6
| 315749 ||  || — || March 26, 2008 || Kitt Peak || Spacewatch || EOS || align=right | 3.6 km || 
|-id=750 bgcolor=#d6d6d6
| 315750 ||  || — || March 27, 2008 || Kitt Peak || Spacewatch || — || align=right | 3.5 km || 
|-id=751 bgcolor=#E9E9E9
| 315751 ||  || — || March 27, 2008 || Kitt Peak || Spacewatch || — || align=right | 3.0 km || 
|-id=752 bgcolor=#d6d6d6
| 315752 ||  || — || March 27, 2008 || Kitt Peak || Spacewatch || — || align=right | 3.2 km || 
|-id=753 bgcolor=#E9E9E9
| 315753 ||  || — || March 28, 2008 || Mount Lemmon || Mount Lemmon Survey || MIS || align=right | 2.7 km || 
|-id=754 bgcolor=#E9E9E9
| 315754 ||  || — || March 28, 2008 || Kitt Peak || Spacewatch || AGN || align=right | 1.4 km || 
|-id=755 bgcolor=#E9E9E9
| 315755 ||  || — || March 28, 2008 || Kitt Peak || Spacewatch || — || align=right | 1.5 km || 
|-id=756 bgcolor=#E9E9E9
| 315756 ||  || — || February 27, 2008 || Mount Lemmon || Mount Lemmon Survey || — || align=right | 2.2 km || 
|-id=757 bgcolor=#E9E9E9
| 315757 ||  || — || March 28, 2008 || Kitt Peak || Spacewatch || HOF || align=right | 3.0 km || 
|-id=758 bgcolor=#E9E9E9
| 315758 ||  || — || March 28, 2008 || Mount Lemmon || Mount Lemmon Survey || — || align=right | 1.3 km || 
|-id=759 bgcolor=#d6d6d6
| 315759 ||  || — || March 28, 2008 || Mount Lemmon || Mount Lemmon Survey || — || align=right | 3.2 km || 
|-id=760 bgcolor=#E9E9E9
| 315760 ||  || — || March 28, 2008 || Mount Lemmon || Mount Lemmon Survey || — || align=right | 2.5 km || 
|-id=761 bgcolor=#E9E9E9
| 315761 ||  || — || March 29, 2008 || Mount Lemmon || Mount Lemmon Survey || ADE || align=right | 3.2 km || 
|-id=762 bgcolor=#d6d6d6
| 315762 ||  || — || March 27, 2008 || Kitt Peak || Spacewatch || — || align=right | 3.3 km || 
|-id=763 bgcolor=#E9E9E9
| 315763 ||  || — || March 28, 2008 || Mount Lemmon || Mount Lemmon Survey || — || align=right | 2.4 km || 
|-id=764 bgcolor=#E9E9E9
| 315764 ||  || — || March 28, 2008 || Mount Lemmon || Mount Lemmon Survey || MIS || align=right | 2.4 km || 
|-id=765 bgcolor=#d6d6d6
| 315765 ||  || — || March 28, 2008 || Mount Lemmon || Mount Lemmon Survey || — || align=right | 3.2 km || 
|-id=766 bgcolor=#d6d6d6
| 315766 ||  || — || March 28, 2008 || Kitt Peak || Spacewatch || EOS || align=right | 2.5 km || 
|-id=767 bgcolor=#d6d6d6
| 315767 ||  || — || September 10, 2004 || Kitt Peak || Spacewatch || — || align=right | 2.8 km || 
|-id=768 bgcolor=#E9E9E9
| 315768 ||  || — || March 31, 2008 || Mount Lemmon || Mount Lemmon Survey || — || align=right | 1.1 km || 
|-id=769 bgcolor=#E9E9E9
| 315769 ||  || — || March 31, 2008 || Mayhill || A. Lowe || JUN || align=right | 1.4 km || 
|-id=770 bgcolor=#E9E9E9
| 315770 ||  || — || March 30, 2008 || Catalina || CSS || — || align=right | 3.1 km || 
|-id=771 bgcolor=#E9E9E9
| 315771 ||  || — || March 27, 2008 || Mount Lemmon || Mount Lemmon Survey || — || align=right | 1.00 km || 
|-id=772 bgcolor=#E9E9E9
| 315772 ||  || — || March 28, 2008 || Mount Lemmon || Mount Lemmon Survey || — || align=right | 2.4 km || 
|-id=773 bgcolor=#E9E9E9
| 315773 ||  || — || March 29, 2008 || Kitt Peak || Spacewatch || AEO || align=right | 1.6 km || 
|-id=774 bgcolor=#E9E9E9
| 315774 ||  || — || March 29, 2008 || Catalina || CSS || — || align=right | 1.9 km || 
|-id=775 bgcolor=#d6d6d6
| 315775 ||  || — || March 30, 2008 || Kitt Peak || Spacewatch || — || align=right | 3.5 km || 
|-id=776 bgcolor=#d6d6d6
| 315776 ||  || — || March 30, 2008 || Kitt Peak || Spacewatch || HYG || align=right | 3.1 km || 
|-id=777 bgcolor=#E9E9E9
| 315777 ||  || — || February 10, 2008 || Mount Lemmon || Mount Lemmon Survey || — || align=right | 1.2 km || 
|-id=778 bgcolor=#d6d6d6
| 315778 ||  || — || March 30, 2008 || Kitt Peak || Spacewatch || — || align=right | 3.0 km || 
|-id=779 bgcolor=#E9E9E9
| 315779 ||  || — || March 31, 2008 || Kitt Peak || Spacewatch || — || align=right | 2.3 km || 
|-id=780 bgcolor=#E9E9E9
| 315780 ||  || — || March 31, 2008 || Mount Lemmon || Mount Lemmon Survey || — || align=right | 2.4 km || 
|-id=781 bgcolor=#E9E9E9
| 315781 ||  || — || March 31, 2008 || Mount Lemmon || Mount Lemmon Survey || — || align=right | 2.7 km || 
|-id=782 bgcolor=#E9E9E9
| 315782 ||  || — || March 31, 2008 || Mount Lemmon || Mount Lemmon Survey || — || align=right | 2.0 km || 
|-id=783 bgcolor=#d6d6d6
| 315783 ||  || — || March 31, 2008 || Mount Lemmon || Mount Lemmon Survey || KAR || align=right | 1.3 km || 
|-id=784 bgcolor=#d6d6d6
| 315784 ||  || — || March 31, 2008 || Mount Lemmon || Mount Lemmon Survey || KAR || align=right | 1.1 km || 
|-id=785 bgcolor=#E9E9E9
| 315785 ||  || — || March 31, 2008 || Mount Lemmon || Mount Lemmon Survey || MIS || align=right | 2.1 km || 
|-id=786 bgcolor=#d6d6d6
| 315786 ||  || — || March 28, 2008 || Kitt Peak || Spacewatch || VER || align=right | 4.1 km || 
|-id=787 bgcolor=#E9E9E9
| 315787 ||  || — || March 31, 2008 || Kitt Peak || Spacewatch || — || align=right | 1.8 km || 
|-id=788 bgcolor=#d6d6d6
| 315788 ||  || — || March 31, 2008 || Kitt Peak || Spacewatch || — || align=right | 3.6 km || 
|-id=789 bgcolor=#d6d6d6
| 315789 ||  || — || March 29, 2008 || Catalina || CSS || EOS || align=right | 2.3 km || 
|-id=790 bgcolor=#E9E9E9
| 315790 ||  || — || March 31, 2008 || Mount Lemmon || Mount Lemmon Survey || WIT || align=right | 1.2 km || 
|-id=791 bgcolor=#E9E9E9
| 315791 ||  || — || March 29, 2008 || Mount Lemmon || Mount Lemmon Survey || — || align=right data-sort-value="0.91" | 910 m || 
|-id=792 bgcolor=#d6d6d6
| 315792 ||  || — || March 28, 2008 || Mount Lemmon || Mount Lemmon Survey || KOR || align=right | 1.7 km || 
|-id=793 bgcolor=#E9E9E9
| 315793 ||  || — || April 3, 2008 || La Sagra || OAM Obs. || — || align=right | 1.9 km || 
|-id=794 bgcolor=#E9E9E9
| 315794 ||  || — || April 5, 2008 || Socorro || LINEAR || JUN || align=right | 1.5 km || 
|-id=795 bgcolor=#E9E9E9
| 315795 ||  || — || August 29, 2005 || Kitt Peak || Spacewatch || WIT || align=right | 1.1 km || 
|-id=796 bgcolor=#d6d6d6
| 315796 ||  || — || April 1, 2008 || Kitt Peak || Spacewatch || — || align=right | 3.3 km || 
|-id=797 bgcolor=#d6d6d6
| 315797 ||  || — || April 1, 2008 || Kitt Peak || Spacewatch || — || align=right | 3.0 km || 
|-id=798 bgcolor=#E9E9E9
| 315798 ||  || — || April 1, 2008 || Kitt Peak || Spacewatch || — || align=right | 1.8 km || 
|-id=799 bgcolor=#E9E9E9
| 315799 ||  || — || April 1, 2008 || Kitt Peak || Spacewatch || — || align=right | 1.2 km || 
|-id=800 bgcolor=#E9E9E9
| 315800 ||  || — || March 13, 2008 || Kitt Peak || Spacewatch || AGN || align=right | 1.3 km || 
|}

315801–315900 

|-bgcolor=#E9E9E9
| 315801 ||  || — || April 3, 2008 || Kitt Peak || Spacewatch || DOR || align=right | 3.1 km || 
|-id=802 bgcolor=#E9E9E9
| 315802 ||  || — || April 1, 2008 || Mount Lemmon || Mount Lemmon Survey || HOF || align=right | 3.5 km || 
|-id=803 bgcolor=#d6d6d6
| 315803 ||  || — || April 1, 2008 || Mount Lemmon || Mount Lemmon Survey || — || align=right | 2.7 km || 
|-id=804 bgcolor=#E9E9E9
| 315804 ||  || — || April 3, 2008 || Kitt Peak || Spacewatch || WIT || align=right | 1.2 km || 
|-id=805 bgcolor=#d6d6d6
| 315805 ||  || — || April 3, 2008 || Kitt Peak || Spacewatch || VER || align=right | 3.2 km || 
|-id=806 bgcolor=#d6d6d6
| 315806 ||  || — || April 3, 2008 || Mount Lemmon || Mount Lemmon Survey || — || align=right | 3.7 km || 
|-id=807 bgcolor=#E9E9E9
| 315807 ||  || — || April 4, 2008 || Mount Lemmon || Mount Lemmon Survey || — || align=right | 1.7 km || 
|-id=808 bgcolor=#d6d6d6
| 315808 ||  || — || April 5, 2008 || Mount Lemmon || Mount Lemmon Survey || — || align=right | 2.4 km || 
|-id=809 bgcolor=#E9E9E9
| 315809 ||  || — || April 5, 2008 || Kitt Peak || Spacewatch || — || align=right data-sort-value="0.98" | 980 m || 
|-id=810 bgcolor=#E9E9E9
| 315810 ||  || — || April 5, 2008 || Catalina || CSS || — || align=right | 3.1 km || 
|-id=811 bgcolor=#d6d6d6
| 315811 ||  || — || April 6, 2008 || Kitt Peak || Spacewatch || — || align=right | 2.7 km || 
|-id=812 bgcolor=#d6d6d6
| 315812 ||  || — || April 7, 2008 || Mount Lemmon || Mount Lemmon Survey || CHA || align=right | 1.9 km || 
|-id=813 bgcolor=#E9E9E9
| 315813 ||  || — || April 7, 2008 || Mount Lemmon || Mount Lemmon Survey || — || align=right | 1.7 km || 
|-id=814 bgcolor=#E9E9E9
| 315814 ||  || — || April 7, 2008 || Kitt Peak || Spacewatch || — || align=right | 2.3 km || 
|-id=815 bgcolor=#E9E9E9
| 315815 ||  || — || April 8, 2008 || Kitt Peak || Spacewatch || — || align=right | 1.7 km || 
|-id=816 bgcolor=#d6d6d6
| 315816 ||  || — || April 8, 2008 || Kitt Peak || Spacewatch || — || align=right | 4.1 km || 
|-id=817 bgcolor=#d6d6d6
| 315817 ||  || — || April 8, 2008 || Kitt Peak || Spacewatch || — || align=right | 3.3 km || 
|-id=818 bgcolor=#E9E9E9
| 315818 ||  || — || April 6, 2008 || Kitt Peak || Spacewatch || — || align=right | 1.5 km || 
|-id=819 bgcolor=#d6d6d6
| 315819 ||  || — || April 6, 2008 || Mount Lemmon || Mount Lemmon Survey || EOS || align=right | 3.1 km || 
|-id=820 bgcolor=#E9E9E9
| 315820 ||  || — || April 6, 2008 || Catalina || CSS || — || align=right | 1.7 km || 
|-id=821 bgcolor=#E9E9E9
| 315821 ||  || — || April 8, 2008 || Kitt Peak || Spacewatch || MRX || align=right | 3.4 km || 
|-id=822 bgcolor=#E9E9E9
| 315822 ||  || — || April 8, 2008 || Kitt Peak || Spacewatch || — || align=right | 2.5 km || 
|-id=823 bgcolor=#E9E9E9
| 315823 ||  || — || April 8, 2008 || Kitt Peak || Spacewatch || — || align=right | 1.9 km || 
|-id=824 bgcolor=#E9E9E9
| 315824 ||  || — || April 8, 2008 || Kitt Peak || Spacewatch || AGN || align=right | 1.6 km || 
|-id=825 bgcolor=#E9E9E9
| 315825 ||  || — || April 8, 2008 || Kitt Peak || Spacewatch || AGN || align=right | 1.4 km || 
|-id=826 bgcolor=#E9E9E9
| 315826 ||  || — || April 9, 2008 || Kitt Peak || Spacewatch || AST || align=right | 2.0 km || 
|-id=827 bgcolor=#E9E9E9
| 315827 ||  || — || April 11, 2008 || Kitt Peak || Spacewatch || AST || align=right | 1.6 km || 
|-id=828 bgcolor=#E9E9E9
| 315828 ||  || — || April 11, 2008 || Mount Lemmon || Mount Lemmon Survey || — || align=right | 2.4 km || 
|-id=829 bgcolor=#E9E9E9
| 315829 ||  || — || April 13, 2008 || Catalina || CSS || — || align=right | 3.1 km || 
|-id=830 bgcolor=#E9E9E9
| 315830 ||  || — || March 29, 2008 || Kitt Peak || Spacewatch || NEM || align=right | 2.5 km || 
|-id=831 bgcolor=#E9E9E9
| 315831 ||  || — || April 13, 2008 || Mount Lemmon || Mount Lemmon Survey || — || align=right | 3.1 km || 
|-id=832 bgcolor=#d6d6d6
| 315832 ||  || — || April 13, 2008 || Mount Lemmon || Mount Lemmon Survey || — || align=right | 3.5 km || 
|-id=833 bgcolor=#d6d6d6
| 315833 ||  || — || April 14, 2008 || Mount Lemmon || Mount Lemmon Survey || — || align=right | 3.6 km || 
|-id=834 bgcolor=#d6d6d6
| 315834 ||  || — || April 1, 2008 || Kitt Peak || Spacewatch || THM || align=right | 2.6 km || 
|-id=835 bgcolor=#E9E9E9
| 315835 ||  || — || April 6, 2008 || Kitt Peak || Spacewatch || MRX || align=right | 1.1 km || 
|-id=836 bgcolor=#d6d6d6
| 315836 ||  || — || April 3, 2008 || Mount Lemmon || Mount Lemmon Survey || — || align=right | 3.4 km || 
|-id=837 bgcolor=#d6d6d6
| 315837 ||  || — || April 12, 2008 || Socorro || LINEAR || — || align=right | 4.1 km || 
|-id=838 bgcolor=#E9E9E9
| 315838 ||  || — || April 24, 2008 || Kitt Peak || Spacewatch || — || align=right | 2.3 km || 
|-id=839 bgcolor=#d6d6d6
| 315839 ||  || — || April 24, 2008 || Kitt Peak || Spacewatch || — || align=right | 3.1 km || 
|-id=840 bgcolor=#d6d6d6
| 315840 ||  || — || April 24, 2008 || Kitt Peak || Spacewatch || EOS || align=right | 2.2 km || 
|-id=841 bgcolor=#d6d6d6
| 315841 ||  || — || April 3, 2008 || Mount Lemmon || Mount Lemmon Survey || EOS || align=right | 2.3 km || 
|-id=842 bgcolor=#d6d6d6
| 315842 ||  || — || April 24, 2008 || Kitt Peak || Spacewatch || VER || align=right | 3.5 km || 
|-id=843 bgcolor=#d6d6d6
| 315843 ||  || — || April 24, 2008 || Kitt Peak || Spacewatch || — || align=right | 3.4 km || 
|-id=844 bgcolor=#E9E9E9
| 315844 ||  || — || April 24, 2008 || Catalina || CSS || — || align=right | 1.7 km || 
|-id=845 bgcolor=#d6d6d6
| 315845 ||  || — || April 25, 2008 || Kitt Peak || Spacewatch || — || align=right | 2.9 km || 
|-id=846 bgcolor=#E9E9E9
| 315846 ||  || — || April 25, 2008 || Kitt Peak || Spacewatch || — || align=right | 2.5 km || 
|-id=847 bgcolor=#d6d6d6
| 315847 ||  || — || April 25, 2008 || Kitt Peak || Spacewatch || — || align=right | 2.8 km || 
|-id=848 bgcolor=#E9E9E9
| 315848 ||  || — || April 26, 2008 || Mount Lemmon || Mount Lemmon Survey || HNA || align=right | 2.1 km || 
|-id=849 bgcolor=#d6d6d6
| 315849 ||  || — || April 14, 2008 || Mount Lemmon || Mount Lemmon Survey || — || align=right | 3.9 km || 
|-id=850 bgcolor=#d6d6d6
| 315850 ||  || — || April 4, 2008 || Kitt Peak || Spacewatch || — || align=right | 3.5 km || 
|-id=851 bgcolor=#E9E9E9
| 315851 ||  || — || April 28, 2008 || Kitt Peak || Spacewatch || HOF || align=right | 3.0 km || 
|-id=852 bgcolor=#E9E9E9
| 315852 ||  || — || October 1, 2005 || Kitt Peak || Spacewatch || HOF || align=right | 2.7 km || 
|-id=853 bgcolor=#d6d6d6
| 315853 ||  || — || April 26, 2008 || Kitt Peak || Spacewatch || — || align=right | 3.2 km || 
|-id=854 bgcolor=#d6d6d6
| 315854 ||  || — || April 27, 2008 || Kitt Peak || Spacewatch || — || align=right | 5.8 km || 
|-id=855 bgcolor=#d6d6d6
| 315855 ||  || — || April 27, 2008 || Kitt Peak || Spacewatch || — || align=right | 3.7 km || 
|-id=856 bgcolor=#d6d6d6
| 315856 ||  || — || April 30, 2008 || Kitt Peak || Spacewatch || — || align=right | 3.0 km || 
|-id=857 bgcolor=#d6d6d6
| 315857 ||  || — || April 27, 2008 || Kitt Peak || Spacewatch || — || align=right | 3.7 km || 
|-id=858 bgcolor=#E9E9E9
| 315858 ||  || — || April 27, 2008 || Mount Lemmon || Mount Lemmon Survey || — || align=right | 1.7 km || 
|-id=859 bgcolor=#d6d6d6
| 315859 ||  || — || April 28, 2008 || Kitt Peak || Spacewatch || — || align=right | 3.1 km || 
|-id=860 bgcolor=#d6d6d6
| 315860 ||  || — || April 28, 2008 || Kitt Peak || Spacewatch || EOS || align=right | 2.3 km || 
|-id=861 bgcolor=#d6d6d6
| 315861 ||  || — || April 29, 2008 || Mount Lemmon || Mount Lemmon Survey || — || align=right | 3.8 km || 
|-id=862 bgcolor=#E9E9E9
| 315862 ||  || — || April 29, 2008 || Kitt Peak || Spacewatch || AEO || align=right | 1.1 km || 
|-id=863 bgcolor=#d6d6d6
| 315863 ||  || — || April 29, 2008 || Kitt Peak || Spacewatch || — || align=right | 3.6 km || 
|-id=864 bgcolor=#d6d6d6
| 315864 ||  || — || April 30, 2008 || Kitt Peak || Spacewatch || EOS || align=right | 2.2 km || 
|-id=865 bgcolor=#d6d6d6
| 315865 ||  || — || April 30, 2008 || Kitt Peak || Spacewatch || — || align=right | 2.7 km || 
|-id=866 bgcolor=#d6d6d6
| 315866 ||  || — || April 30, 2008 || Mount Lemmon || Mount Lemmon Survey || — || align=right | 3.7 km || 
|-id=867 bgcolor=#d6d6d6
| 315867 ||  || — || April 26, 2008 || Catalina || CSS || EUP || align=right | 7.3 km || 
|-id=868 bgcolor=#d6d6d6
| 315868 ||  || — || April 29, 2008 || Kitt Peak || Spacewatch || — || align=right | 3.2 km || 
|-id=869 bgcolor=#d6d6d6
| 315869 ||  || — || April 17, 2008 || Mount Lemmon || Mount Lemmon Survey || — || align=right | 5.7 km || 
|-id=870 bgcolor=#d6d6d6
| 315870 ||  || — || November 27, 2006 || Mount Lemmon || Mount Lemmon Survey || — || align=right | 4.7 km || 
|-id=871 bgcolor=#d6d6d6
| 315871 ||  || — || May 2, 2008 || Kitt Peak || Spacewatch || EOS || align=right | 1.8 km || 
|-id=872 bgcolor=#E9E9E9
| 315872 ||  || — || May 3, 2008 || Mount Lemmon || Mount Lemmon Survey || WIT || align=right data-sort-value="0.97" | 970 m || 
|-id=873 bgcolor=#d6d6d6
| 315873 ||  || — || May 3, 2008 || Kitt Peak || Spacewatch || — || align=right | 4.2 km || 
|-id=874 bgcolor=#d6d6d6
| 315874 ||  || — || May 3, 2008 || Kitt Peak || Spacewatch || — || align=right | 2.7 km || 
|-id=875 bgcolor=#d6d6d6
| 315875 ||  || — || May 9, 2008 || Bergisch Gladbac || W. Bickel || — || align=right | 3.2 km || 
|-id=876 bgcolor=#d6d6d6
| 315876 ||  || — || May 7, 2008 || Kitt Peak || Spacewatch || — || align=right | 3.7 km || 
|-id=877 bgcolor=#d6d6d6
| 315877 ||  || — || May 8, 2008 || Kitt Peak || Spacewatch || — || align=right | 3.0 km || 
|-id=878 bgcolor=#E9E9E9
| 315878 ||  || — || May 12, 2008 || Kitt Peak || Spacewatch || — || align=right | 2.4 km || 
|-id=879 bgcolor=#d6d6d6
| 315879 ||  || — || May 11, 2008 || Kitt Peak || Spacewatch || — || align=right | 3.2 km || 
|-id=880 bgcolor=#d6d6d6
| 315880 ||  || — || May 14, 2008 || Mount Lemmon || Mount Lemmon Survey || — || align=right | 3.8 km || 
|-id=881 bgcolor=#d6d6d6
| 315881 ||  || — || May 26, 2008 || Kitt Peak || Spacewatch || EOS || align=right | 2.7 km || 
|-id=882 bgcolor=#d6d6d6
| 315882 ||  || — || May 27, 2008 || Kitt Peak || Spacewatch || EOS || align=right | 4.5 km || 
|-id=883 bgcolor=#E9E9E9
| 315883 ||  || — || May 27, 2008 || Kitt Peak || Spacewatch || — || align=right | 1.9 km || 
|-id=884 bgcolor=#d6d6d6
| 315884 ||  || — || May 27, 2008 || Kitt Peak || Spacewatch || — || align=right | 3.7 km || 
|-id=885 bgcolor=#d6d6d6
| 315885 ||  || — || May 27, 2008 || Kitt Peak || Spacewatch || EOS || align=right | 2.4 km || 
|-id=886 bgcolor=#E9E9E9
| 315886 ||  || — || May 28, 2008 || Mount Lemmon || Mount Lemmon Survey || MRX || align=right | 1.0 km || 
|-id=887 bgcolor=#d6d6d6
| 315887 ||  || — || May 29, 2008 || Kitt Peak || Spacewatch || — || align=right | 3.2 km || 
|-id=888 bgcolor=#d6d6d6
| 315888 ||  || — || May 29, 2008 || Kitt Peak || Spacewatch || — || align=right | 3.6 km || 
|-id=889 bgcolor=#d6d6d6
| 315889 ||  || — || May 29, 2008 || Kitt Peak || Spacewatch || VER || align=right | 3.2 km || 
|-id=890 bgcolor=#d6d6d6
| 315890 ||  || — || May 29, 2008 || Mount Lemmon || Mount Lemmon Survey || — || align=right | 3.5 km || 
|-id=891 bgcolor=#d6d6d6
| 315891 ||  || — || May 30, 2008 || Kitt Peak || Spacewatch || — || align=right | 3.8 km || 
|-id=892 bgcolor=#d6d6d6
| 315892 ||  || — || May 31, 2008 || Kitt Peak || Spacewatch || EOS || align=right | 2.2 km || 
|-id=893 bgcolor=#d6d6d6
| 315893 ||  || — || June 1, 2008 || Kitt Peak || Spacewatch || — || align=right | 4.1 km || 
|-id=894 bgcolor=#d6d6d6
| 315894 ||  || — || June 2, 2008 || Kitt Peak || Spacewatch || — || align=right | 4.2 km || 
|-id=895 bgcolor=#d6d6d6
| 315895 ||  || — || June 3, 2008 || Kitt Peak || Spacewatch || — || align=right | 3.9 km || 
|-id=896 bgcolor=#d6d6d6
| 315896 ||  || — || June 6, 2008 || Kitt Peak || Spacewatch || — || align=right | 3.7 km || 
|-id=897 bgcolor=#fefefe
| 315897 ||  || — || August 24, 2008 || Dauban || F. Kugel || H || align=right data-sort-value="0.86" | 860 m || 
|-id=898 bgcolor=#C7FF8F
| 315898 ||  || — || August 25, 2008 || La Sagra || OAM Obs. || centaur || align=right | 24 km || 
|-id=899 bgcolor=#d6d6d6
| 315899 ||  || — || August 30, 2008 || Alter Satzberg || M. Pietschnig || — || align=right | 3.9 km || 
|-id=900 bgcolor=#d6d6d6
| 315900 ||  || — || August 26, 2008 || Socorro || LINEAR || — || align=right | 4.4 km || 
|}

315901–316000 

|-bgcolor=#C2FFFF
| 315901 ||  || — || August 21, 2008 || Kitt Peak || Spacewatch || L4 || align=right | 7.6 km || 
|-id=902 bgcolor=#C2FFFF
| 315902 ||  || — || August 24, 2008 || Kitt Peak || Spacewatch || L4 || align=right | 9.2 km || 
|-id=903 bgcolor=#C2FFFF
| 315903 ||  || — || August 24, 2008 || Kitt Peak || Spacewatch || L4 || align=right | 11 km || 
|-id=904 bgcolor=#d6d6d6
| 315904 ||  || — || September 2, 2008 || Calvin-Rehoboth || L. A. Molnar || LIX || align=right | 5.8 km || 
|-id=905 bgcolor=#C2FFFF
| 315905 ||  || — || September 2, 2008 || Kitt Peak || Spacewatch || L4 || align=right | 8.6 km || 
|-id=906 bgcolor=#C2FFFF
| 315906 ||  || — || September 2, 2008 || Kitt Peak || Spacewatch || L4 || align=right | 8.4 km || 
|-id=907 bgcolor=#C2FFFF
| 315907 ||  || — || September 4, 2008 || Kitt Peak || Spacewatch || L4 || align=right | 9.3 km || 
|-id=908 bgcolor=#d6d6d6
| 315908 ||  || — || September 2, 2008 || Kitt Peak || Spacewatch || HIL3:2 || align=right | 7.1 km || 
|-id=909 bgcolor=#C2FFFF
| 315909 ||  || — || February 13, 2002 || Kitt Peak || Spacewatch || L4 || align=right | 9.0 km || 
|-id=910 bgcolor=#C2FFFF
| 315910 ||  || — || September 4, 2008 || Kitt Peak || Spacewatch || L4 || align=right | 13 km || 
|-id=911 bgcolor=#C2FFFF
| 315911 ||  || — || September 4, 2008 || Kitt Peak || Spacewatch || L4 || align=right | 13 km || 
|-id=912 bgcolor=#d6d6d6
| 315912 ||  || — || September 5, 2008 || Kitt Peak || Spacewatch || — || align=right | 4.3 km || 
|-id=913 bgcolor=#C2FFFF
| 315913 ||  || — || September 2, 2008 || Kitt Peak || Spacewatch || L4 || align=right | 7.2 km || 
|-id=914 bgcolor=#C2FFFF
| 315914 ||  || — || September 5, 2008 || Kitt Peak || Spacewatch || L4 || align=right | 8.5 km || 
|-id=915 bgcolor=#C2FFFF
| 315915 ||  || — || September 5, 2008 || Kitt Peak || Spacewatch || L4ERY || align=right | 8.9 km || 
|-id=916 bgcolor=#C2FFFF
| 315916 ||  || — || September 6, 2008 || Mount Lemmon || Mount Lemmon Survey || L4 || align=right | 9.8 km || 
|-id=917 bgcolor=#C2FFFF
| 315917 ||  || — || September 7, 2008 || Mount Lemmon || Mount Lemmon Survey || L4 || align=right | 7.0 km || 
|-id=918 bgcolor=#C2FFFF
| 315918 ||  || — || September 4, 2008 || Kitt Peak || Spacewatch || L4ERY || align=right | 8.3 km || 
|-id=919 bgcolor=#C2FFFF
| 315919 ||  || — || September 6, 2008 || Kitt Peak || Spacewatch || L4 || align=right | 9.2 km || 
|-id=920 bgcolor=#d6d6d6
| 315920 ||  || — || September 6, 2008 || Kitt Peak || Spacewatch || — || align=right | 3.9 km || 
|-id=921 bgcolor=#C2FFFF
| 315921 ||  || — || September 19, 2008 || Kitt Peak || Spacewatch || L4 || align=right | 9.0 km || 
|-id=922 bgcolor=#C2FFFF
| 315922 ||  || — || September 19, 2008 || Kitt Peak || Spacewatch || L4 || align=right | 8.9 km || 
|-id=923 bgcolor=#C2FFFF
| 315923 ||  || — || September 20, 2008 || Kitt Peak || Spacewatch || L4 || align=right | 12 km || 
|-id=924 bgcolor=#d6d6d6
| 315924 ||  || — || September 20, 2008 || Kitt Peak || Spacewatch || HIL3:2 || align=right | 6.4 km || 
|-id=925 bgcolor=#C2FFFF
| 315925 ||  || — || September 21, 2008 || Kitt Peak || Spacewatch || L4ERY || align=right | 8.8 km || 
|-id=926 bgcolor=#C2FFFF
| 315926 ||  || — || September 29, 2008 || Dauban || F. Kugel || L4 || align=right | 11 km || 
|-id=927 bgcolor=#fefefe
| 315927 ||  || — || September 28, 2008 || Socorro || LINEAR || H || align=right data-sort-value="0.78" | 780 m || 
|-id=928 bgcolor=#C2FFFF
| 315928 ||  || — || September 25, 2008 || Bergisch Gladbac || W. Bickel || L4 || align=right | 10 km || 
|-id=929 bgcolor=#d6d6d6
| 315929 ||  || — || September 30, 2008 || La Sagra || OAM Obs. || EUP || align=right | 6.7 km || 
|-id=930 bgcolor=#d6d6d6
| 315930 ||  || — || May 25, 2006 || Mount Lemmon || Mount Lemmon Survey || HIL3:2 || align=right | 8.4 km || 
|-id=931 bgcolor=#C2FFFF
| 315931 ||  || — || September 28, 2008 || Mount Lemmon || Mount Lemmon Survey || L4 || align=right | 9.9 km || 
|-id=932 bgcolor=#C2FFFF
| 315932 ||  || — || September 22, 2008 || Kitt Peak || Spacewatch || L4 || align=right | 9.8 km || 
|-id=933 bgcolor=#C2FFFF
| 315933 ||  || — || September 23, 2008 || Kitt Peak || Spacewatch || L4 || align=right | 9.8 km || 
|-id=934 bgcolor=#C2FFFF
| 315934 ||  || — || September 24, 2008 || Mount Lemmon || Mount Lemmon Survey || L4 || align=right | 11 km || 
|-id=935 bgcolor=#C2FFFF
| 315935 ||  || — || October 1, 2008 || Mount Lemmon || Mount Lemmon Survey || L4 || align=right | 6.5 km || 
|-id=936 bgcolor=#C2FFFF
| 315936 ||  || — || October 1, 2008 || Mount Lemmon || Mount Lemmon Survey || L4 || align=right | 15 km || 
|-id=937 bgcolor=#C2FFFF
| 315937 ||  || — || October 2, 2008 || Kitt Peak || Spacewatch || L4 || align=right | 7.8 km || 
|-id=938 bgcolor=#C2FFFF
| 315938 ||  || — || October 2, 2008 || Kitt Peak || Spacewatch || L4 || align=right | 9.7 km || 
|-id=939 bgcolor=#C2FFFF
| 315939 ||  || — || October 2, 2008 || Kitt Peak || Spacewatch || L4 || align=right | 7.6 km || 
|-id=940 bgcolor=#C2FFFF
| 315940 ||  || — || October 3, 2008 || Mount Lemmon || Mount Lemmon Survey || L4 || align=right | 11 km || 
|-id=941 bgcolor=#C2FFFF
| 315941 ||  || — || October 3, 2008 || La Sagra || OAM Obs. || L4 || align=right | 8.1 km || 
|-id=942 bgcolor=#C2FFFF
| 315942 ||  || — || October 6, 2008 || Kitt Peak || Spacewatch || L4 || align=right | 10 km || 
|-id=943 bgcolor=#C2FFFF
| 315943 ||  || — || October 6, 2008 || Mount Lemmon || Mount Lemmon Survey || L4 || align=right | 8.9 km || 
|-id=944 bgcolor=#C2FFFF
| 315944 ||  || — || October 7, 2008 || Kitt Peak || Spacewatch || L4 || align=right | 9.9 km || 
|-id=945 bgcolor=#C2FFFF
| 315945 ||  || — || October 7, 2008 || Kitt Peak || Spacewatch || L4 || align=right | 8.3 km || 
|-id=946 bgcolor=#fefefe
| 315946 ||  || — || October 7, 2008 || Mount Lemmon || Mount Lemmon Survey || H || align=right data-sort-value="0.71" | 710 m || 
|-id=947 bgcolor=#fefefe
| 315947 ||  || — || October 7, 2008 || Catalina || CSS || H || align=right data-sort-value="0.91" | 910 m || 
|-id=948 bgcolor=#C2FFFF
| 315948 ||  || — || October 8, 2008 || Mount Lemmon || Mount Lemmon Survey || L4 || align=right | 9.1 km || 
|-id=949 bgcolor=#C2FFFF
| 315949 ||  || — || October 8, 2008 || Mount Lemmon || Mount Lemmon Survey || L4ERY || align=right | 11 km || 
|-id=950 bgcolor=#C2FFFF
| 315950 ||  || — || October 8, 2008 || Mount Lemmon || Mount Lemmon Survey || L4ERY || align=right | 9.2 km || 
|-id=951 bgcolor=#C2FFFF
| 315951 ||  || — || October 9, 2008 || Mount Lemmon || Mount Lemmon Survey || L4 || align=right | 7.3 km || 
|-id=952 bgcolor=#C2FFFF
| 315952 ||  || — || October 9, 2008 || Mount Lemmon || Mount Lemmon Survey || L4 || align=right | 9.7 km || 
|-id=953 bgcolor=#C2FFFF
| 315953 ||  || — || October 9, 2008 || Mount Lemmon || Mount Lemmon Survey || L4 || align=right | 8.0 km || 
|-id=954 bgcolor=#C2FFFF
| 315954 ||  || — || October 7, 2008 || Kitt Peak || Spacewatch || L4ERY || align=right | 9.3 km || 
|-id=955 bgcolor=#fefefe
| 315955 ||  || — || October 24, 2008 || Socorro || LINEAR || H || align=right | 1.0 km || 
|-id=956 bgcolor=#C2FFFF
| 315956 ||  || — || September 24, 2008 || Kitt Peak || Spacewatch || L4 || align=right | 10 km || 
|-id=957 bgcolor=#C2FFFF
| 315957 ||  || — || October 17, 2008 || Kitt Peak || Spacewatch || L4 || align=right | 11 km || 
|-id=958 bgcolor=#C2FFFF
| 315958 ||  || — || October 21, 2008 || Mount Lemmon || Mount Lemmon Survey || L4 || align=right | 9.9 km || 
|-id=959 bgcolor=#fefefe
| 315959 ||  || — || October 22, 2008 || Mount Lemmon || Mount Lemmon Survey || H || align=right data-sort-value="0.66" | 660 m || 
|-id=960 bgcolor=#C2FFFF
| 315960 ||  || — || October 25, 2008 || Mount Lemmon || Mount Lemmon Survey || L4 || align=right | 8.9 km || 
|-id=961 bgcolor=#fefefe
| 315961 ||  || — || October 26, 2008 || Socorro || LINEAR || H || align=right data-sort-value="0.62" | 620 m || 
|-id=962 bgcolor=#fefefe
| 315962 ||  || — || October 28, 2008 || Socorro || LINEAR || H || align=right data-sort-value="0.72" | 720 m || 
|-id=963 bgcolor=#fefefe
| 315963 ||  || — || November 2, 2008 || Socorro || LINEAR || H || align=right data-sort-value="0.65" | 650 m || 
|-id=964 bgcolor=#C2FFFF
| 315964 ||  || — || November 17, 2008 || Kitt Peak || Spacewatch || L4 || align=right | 8.7 km || 
|-id=965 bgcolor=#fefefe
| 315965 ||  || — || November 22, 2008 || Mount Lemmon || Mount Lemmon Survey || H || align=right data-sort-value="0.89" | 890 m || 
|-id=966 bgcolor=#fefefe
| 315966 ||  || — || November 18, 2008 || Catalina || CSS || H || align=right data-sort-value="0.82" | 820 m || 
|-id=967 bgcolor=#fefefe
| 315967 ||  || — || December 2, 2008 || Catalina || CSS || H || align=right data-sort-value="0.75" | 750 m || 
|-id=968 bgcolor=#d6d6d6
| 315968 ||  || — || December 19, 2008 || Hibiscus || N. Teamo || — || align=right | 3.3 km || 
|-id=969 bgcolor=#fefefe
| 315969 ||  || — || January 15, 2009 || Kitt Peak || Spacewatch || — || align=right | 1.1 km || 
|-id=970 bgcolor=#fefefe
| 315970 ||  || — || January 15, 2009 || Kitt Peak || Spacewatch || — || align=right | 1.1 km || 
|-id=971 bgcolor=#fefefe
| 315971 ||  || — || January 31, 2009 || Mount Lemmon || Mount Lemmon Survey || — || align=right data-sort-value="0.87" | 870 m || 
|-id=972 bgcolor=#fefefe
| 315972 ||  || — || January 31, 2009 || Mount Lemmon || Mount Lemmon Survey || NYS || align=right data-sort-value="0.63" | 630 m || 
|-id=973 bgcolor=#fefefe
| 315973 ||  || — || January 30, 2009 || Kitt Peak || Spacewatch || — || align=right data-sort-value="0.68" | 680 m || 
|-id=974 bgcolor=#fefefe
| 315974 ||  || — || January 31, 2009 || Kitt Peak || Spacewatch || — || align=right | 1.4 km || 
|-id=975 bgcolor=#fefefe
| 315975 ||  || — || January 31, 2009 || Kitt Peak || Spacewatch || V || align=right data-sort-value="0.80" | 800 m || 
|-id=976 bgcolor=#fefefe
| 315976 ||  || — || February 1, 2009 || Mount Lemmon || Mount Lemmon Survey || — || align=right data-sort-value="0.84" | 840 m || 
|-id=977 bgcolor=#d6d6d6
| 315977 ||  || — || February 1, 2009 || Kitt Peak || Spacewatch || VER || align=right | 5.4 km || 
|-id=978 bgcolor=#fefefe
| 315978 ||  || — || February 1, 2009 || Kitt Peak || Spacewatch || — || align=right data-sort-value="0.79" | 790 m || 
|-id=979 bgcolor=#fefefe
| 315979 ||  || — || February 1, 2009 || Kitt Peak || Spacewatch || FLO || align=right data-sort-value="0.69" | 690 m || 
|-id=980 bgcolor=#fefefe
| 315980 ||  || — || February 2, 2009 || Mount Lemmon || Mount Lemmon Survey || FLO || align=right data-sort-value="0.88" | 880 m || 
|-id=981 bgcolor=#fefefe
| 315981 ||  || — || February 14, 2009 || Kitt Peak || Spacewatch || — || align=right data-sort-value="0.96" | 960 m || 
|-id=982 bgcolor=#fefefe
| 315982 ||  || — || February 4, 2009 || Mount Lemmon || Mount Lemmon Survey || — || align=right data-sort-value="0.77" | 770 m || 
|-id=983 bgcolor=#fefefe
| 315983 ||  || — || February 5, 2009 || Kitt Peak || Spacewatch || — || align=right | 1.0 km || 
|-id=984 bgcolor=#fefefe
| 315984 ||  || — || February 3, 2009 || Kitt Peak || Spacewatch || — || align=right data-sort-value="0.81" | 810 m || 
|-id=985 bgcolor=#fefefe
| 315985 ||  || — || February 5, 2009 || Mount Lemmon || Mount Lemmon Survey || — || align=right data-sort-value="0.92" | 920 m || 
|-id=986 bgcolor=#fefefe
| 315986 ||  || — || February 16, 2009 || Kitt Peak || Spacewatch || — || align=right data-sort-value="0.88" | 880 m || 
|-id=987 bgcolor=#fefefe
| 315987 ||  || — || February 16, 2009 || La Sagra || OAM Obs. || — || align=right data-sort-value="0.69" | 690 m || 
|-id=988 bgcolor=#fefefe
| 315988 ||  || — || February 20, 2009 || Kitt Peak || Spacewatch || — || align=right data-sort-value="0.99" | 990 m || 
|-id=989 bgcolor=#fefefe
| 315989 ||  || — || February 21, 2009 || La Sagra || OAM Obs. || — || align=right data-sort-value="0.91" | 910 m || 
|-id=990 bgcolor=#fefefe
| 315990 ||  || — || February 19, 2009 || Kitt Peak || Spacewatch || — || align=right data-sort-value="0.79" | 790 m || 
|-id=991 bgcolor=#fefefe
| 315991 ||  || — || February 22, 2009 || Kitt Peak || Spacewatch || — || align=right data-sort-value="0.96" | 960 m || 
|-id=992 bgcolor=#fefefe
| 315992 ||  || — || February 22, 2009 || Kitt Peak || Spacewatch || — || align=right data-sort-value="0.91" | 910 m || 
|-id=993 bgcolor=#fefefe
| 315993 ||  || — || October 21, 2007 || Kitt Peak || Spacewatch || — || align=right data-sort-value="0.83" | 830 m || 
|-id=994 bgcolor=#fefefe
| 315994 ||  || — || February 27, 2009 || Kitt Peak || Spacewatch || — || align=right data-sort-value="0.88" | 880 m || 
|-id=995 bgcolor=#fefefe
| 315995 ||  || — || February 26, 2009 || Kitt Peak || Spacewatch || — || align=right data-sort-value="0.94" | 940 m || 
|-id=996 bgcolor=#fefefe
| 315996 ||  || — || February 27, 2009 || Kitt Peak || Spacewatch || — || align=right data-sort-value="0.68" | 680 m || 
|-id=997 bgcolor=#fefefe
| 315997 ||  || — || February 27, 2009 || Kitt Peak || Spacewatch || NYS || align=right data-sort-value="0.87" | 870 m || 
|-id=998 bgcolor=#fefefe
| 315998 ||  || — || February 19, 2009 || Kitt Peak || Spacewatch || — || align=right data-sort-value="0.95" | 950 m || 
|-id=999 bgcolor=#fefefe
| 315999 ||  || — || February 20, 2009 || Kitt Peak || Spacewatch || — || align=right data-sort-value="0.62" | 620 m || 
|-id=000 bgcolor=#fefefe
| 316000 ||  || — || February 21, 2009 || Kitt Peak || Spacewatch || — || align=right data-sort-value="0.74" | 740 m || 
|}

References

External links 
 Discovery Circumstances: Numbered Minor Planets (315001)–(320000) (IAU Minor Planet Center)

0315